= List of Astro Boy (1963 TV series) episodes =

These are the episodes for the Astro Boy television series. The series ran from January 1, 1963, to December 31, 1966, in Japan and from September 7, 1963, to August 20, 1965, in the U.S. on NBC. Note that the dubbed episodes aired out of order, and some episodes were skipped.

== Episode list ==
=== Japan and USA broadcasts ===
No.	Title	Original release date	U.S. airdate
1	"The Birth of Atom" / "The Birth of Astro Boy"; Transliteration: "Atomu Tanjō" (Japanese: アトム誕生)	January 1, 1963	September 7, 1963
"The Birth of Astro Boy" takes place in Metro City, circa 2000 A.D. After the death of his son, Dr. Tenma (Dr. Boynton) copes with his grief by creating Astro Boy, a robotic child who resembles his son. After some time, it becomes clear that Astro is not like Tobi, so his father sells him to Hamegg (Cacciatore), the cruel ringmaster of a robotic circus. At the circus, Astro is forced to fight against Z.O.G. and wins after he discovers some of his abilities. Professor Ochanomizu (Dr. Elefun) protests the abuse of robots and unsuccessfully negotiates for Astro's release. Later that night, Astro revives some robotics that Hamegg plans to sell as scrap metal. A robot named Sparky explodes, causing the whole circus tent to collapse. Astro leads the robots in a rescue mission. Later at a hospital, Astro is liberated from Hamegg as Ochanomizu leaves with him.
2	"Frankenstein" / "Colosso"; Transliteration: "Furanken" (Japanese: フランケン)	January 8, 1963	September 14, 1963
Astro Boy longs to have parents, so Professor Ochanomizu has robot parents custom-made. In a robotic factory, an experimental robotic named Frankenstein (Colosso) goes haywire and escapes. Frankenstein becomes the slave of gangsters led by Acetylene Lamp (Big Boss), who have Frankenstein steal from a safe, a ballet, and a bank. Astro is blamed by Inspector Tawashi (Inspector Gumshoe) for the crimes, but is saved by Ochanomizu. Ochanomizu devises a plan to bait Frankenstein onto a ship using fake diamonds, where Astro defeats Frankenstein. The mobsters arrive, but Astro defeats them and they are soon arrested. Astro is rewarded for his heroism with his recently completed parents. Frankenstein is repaired.
3	"Adventure on Mars" / "Expedition to Mars"; Transliteration: "Kasei Tanken" (Japanese: 火星探検)	January 15, 1963	September 21, 1963
When the first expedition to Mars fails because of a mutiny by the crew, Astro Boy is appointed commander of the second expedition.
4	"Guernica" / "One Million Mammoth Snails"; Transliteration: "Gerunika" (Japanese: ゲルニカ)	January 22, 1963	December 7, 1963
Astro Boy and Professor Ochanomizu investigate the disappearances of campers and mountaineers in the ice mountains, and discover a scientist who unleashes a swarm of snails on the world.
5	"Sphinx" / "The Sphinx"; Transliteration: "Sufinkusu" (Japanese: スフィンクス)	January 29, 1963	September 28, 1963
Astro Boy is tricked by some bandits into helping them search for a treasure in the Egyptian desert.
6	"Lightning Man" / "Zero, the Invisible Robot"; Transliteration: "Denkō Ningen" (Japanese: 電光人間)	February 5, 1963	October 19, 1963
An invisible robot named Denkou (Zero) is stolen by the gangster Skunk Kusai (Fearless Fred Fink), who seeks to use him for criminal purposes. Denkou has no concept of good or bad because of his upbringing under the criminal, but is saved by Astro.
7	"Captain Atom"; Transliteration: "Atomu-taishi" (Japanese: アトム大使)	February 12, 1963	-
Human-like aliens from a world identical to the Earth seek refuge in the Earth as their world is destroyed. However they start creating disputes against the earthlings and even cause a food shortage. Due to it a scientist named Dohyar tries to make the earthlings small with cell-reducing fluid. However Atom is in his way.
8	"Ghost Manufacturing Machine" / "The Spirit Machine"; Transliteration: "Yūrei seizōki" (Japanese: 幽霊製造機)	February 19, 1963	November 9, 1963
In a faraway land, a dictator rises to power and seeks to rule the world.
9	"Black Looks" / "The Deep Freeze"; Transliteration: "Burakku Rukkusu" (Japanese: ブラックルックス)	February 26, 1963	November 30, 1963
Criminal Black Lux (Sharkey Dirk) becomes notorious in the Arctic.
10	"The Fool Ivan" / "Strange Voyage"; Transliteration: "Iwan no Baka" (Japanese: イワンの馬鹿)	March 5, 1963	November 16, 1963
Astro Boy leaps aboard a spaceship just before blastoff.
11	"Time Machine" / "Time Machine"; Transliteration: "Taimu Mashin" (Japanese: タイムマシン)	March 12, 1963	December 29, 1963
Higeoyaji is relaxing at home when suddenly a mysterious ship from the future crashes through his front door, the work of Dr. Time.
12	"Cruciform Island" / "Cross Island"; Transliteration: "Jūjika Shima" (Japanese: 十字架島)	March 19, 1963	October 5, 1963
Cross Island is a mysterious uncharted island where a task force of robots work in great secrecy, extracting valuable stores of uranium.
13	"The Eyes of Christ"; Transliteration: "Kirisuto no me" (Japanese: キリストの眼)	March 26, 1963	-
14	"The Artificial Sun" / "The Artificial Sun"; Transliteration: "Jinkō Taiyō" (Japanese: 人工太陽)	April 2, 1963	November 23, 1963
Film producer Elia Belial plans to ruin Earth using an artificial sun.
15	"Plant People" / "Grass Boy"; Transliteration: "Shokubutsu Ningen" (Japanese: 植物人間)	April 9, 1963	October 12, 1963
Astro runs into two of his friends and stumbles upon an interesting flower. While Astro's friends want to pick it, Astro says to leave the flower alone. Astro then proceeds to tell the tale of the bizarre flower.
16	"The Vehicle, White Planet" / "Silver Comet"; Transliteration: "Shiroi Wakusei gō" (Japanese: 白い惑星号)	April 16, 1963	October 26, 1963
Young Koichi (Tommy Speed) prepares to enter a world race with his supersonic car, the Silver Comet.
17	"Robot Land" / "Hullabaloo Land"; Transliteration: "Robotto Rando" (Japanese: ロボットランド)	April 23, 1963	November 2, 1963
Saturn (Baron Von Hoodwink), an evil robot kidnaps Princess Odette (Princess Lollipop), a robot swan who can turn back into her normal self when everyone's asleep. Princess Odette runs away from Hullabaloo Land as Astro comes to her aid.
18	"Gadem" / "Gangor the Monster"; Transliteration: "Gademu" (Japanese: ガデム)	April 30, 1963	December 14, 1963
A robot centipede disguised as 47 wrestling robots causes havoc on a ship and in the ocean.
19	"Atom vs. Garon" / "The Cosmic Giant"; Transliteration: "Atomu tai Majin" (Japanese: アトム対魔神)	May 7, 1963	January 3, 1964
Garon, a giant cosmic robot lands on Earth as a meteor, then Astro Boy and the scientists reconstruct him. During a thunderstorm, Garon revives. A corrupt scientist tells Garon to reconstruct an island in the image of his home planet, also changing the atmosphere to match that of the planet, which is toxic to life on Earth.
20	"Gaseous Beings" / "Toxor, the Mist Man"; Transliteration: "Kitai Ningen" (Japanese: 気体人間)	May 14, 1963	January 10, 1964
Astronauts report seeing fireflies in space, but they are really gaseous beings led by the evil Toxor.
21	"Satellite R-45" / "Satellite R-45"; Transliteration: "Jinkō-eisei R-45" (Japanese: 人工衛星R-45)	May 21, 1963	January 17, 1964
At the large space station Satellite R-45, Astro Boy discovers two souvenir vendors hawking stolen wares.
22	"Sea Serpent Island" / "Sea Serpent Isle"; Transliteration: "Umihebi Shima" (Japanese: 海蛇島)	May 28, 1963	January 24, 1964
At a beach Astro Boy spots a mysterious bottle with a note calling for rescue from an uncharted island called Sea Serpent Isle.
23	"The Mutant" / "The Deadly Flies"; Transliteration: "Myūtanto" (Japanese: ミュータント)	June 4, 1963	January 31, 1964
A mysterious epidemic causes people to drop into comas.
24	"The Submarine Kingdom" / "Kingdom of the Sea"; Transliteration: "Kaitei Ōkoku" (Japanese: 海底王国)	June 11, 1963	February 7, 1964
A strange robot demands that Astro Boy and Professor Ochanomizu accompany him to an unknown kingdom at the bottom of the sea.
25	"The Deep-Underground Tank"; Transliteration: "Chitei Sensha" (Japanese: 地底戦車)	June 18, 1963	-
26	"Atlas" / "Don Tay's Infernal Machine"; Transliteration: "Atorasu" (Japanese: アトラス)	June 25, 1963	February 21, 1964
An evil scientist who hates civilization named Dr. Ram (Don Tay) invents a robot called Atlas to destroy a village.
27	"Planet Pearl" / "Pearl People"; Transliteration: "Pāru Hoshi" (Japanese: パール星)	July 2, 1963	February 28, 1964
Time after time, mysterious forces destroy the huge underwater dam being built by the Institute of Science.
28	"Mad Machine" / "The Wacky Machine"; Transliteration: "Maddo Mashin" (Japanese: マッドマシン)	July 9, 1963	March 6, 1964
Dr. Fooler (Dr. I.Q. Plenty) pitches to some plant owners a machine that makes troublesome robots wacky and therefore harmless. The plant owners accept, and the device affects every robot in the city including Astro Boy.
29	"The Memorable Day" / "Memory Day"; Transliteration: "Omoide no Hi" (Japanese: 想い出の日)	July 16, 1963	March 13, 1964
Once a year, the citizens of Earth celebrate Memory Day and honor the memories of family members who have traveled far into the universe.
30	"Fuhrer ZZZ" / "Secret Agent 3-Z"; Transliteration: "Zē Zē Zē Sōtō" (Japanese: ZZZ総統)	July 23, 1963	December 21, 1963
A president fears for his life, as the presidents of several other countries have all been attacked by Führer ZZZ (Secret Agent 3-Z).
31	"The Black Cosmic Ray" / "Mysterious Cosmic Rays"; Transliteration: "Kuroi Uchūsen" (Japanese: 黒い宇宙線)	July 30, 1963	March 27, 1964
A monster appears in the city, and it turns out to be Dr. Dorian, who has been exiled to Mars. He turns into a monster because he cannot get cosmic X-rays on the Earth.
32	"Hot Dog Corps"; Transliteration: "Hotto Doggu Heidan" (Japanese: ホットドッグ兵団)	August 6, 1963	-
33	"Three Magicians" / "The Three Magicians"; Transliteration: "Sannin no Majutsushi" (Japanese: 三人の魔術師)	August 13, 1963	April 10, 1964
Kino (Abracadabra), a robot magician is approached by a strange magician named Tenpercent, who later frames him for stealing art paintings from a museum. With Astro's help Kino must provide the evidence that he was framed.
34	"Midoro Marsh" / "Beast From 20,000 Fathoms"; Transliteration: "Midoro ga Numa" (Japanese: ミドロが沼)	August 20, 1963	April 17, 1964
The civilized world is shocked to hear about the sighting of a horrific monster.
35	"The Human Farm" / "Planet X"; Transliteration: "Ningen Bokujō" (Japanese: ヒューマンファーム)	August 27, 1963	April 24, 1964
Astro Boy sets out on a rocket to rescue people who have been kidnapped for use as livestock on a planet.
36	"The Religion of Pui Pui" / "The Elixir of Life"; Transliteration: "Pui Pui Kyō" (Japanese: プイプイ教)	September 3, 1963	May 1, 1964
The members of the religious group Pui Pui are looking for a wonder drug that will give them immortality. Dr. Tatsuji, who has succeeded in developing such a drug, is taken away by the religious group. So Astro Boy fights them to ensure the peaceful use of the drug.
37	"Uran" / "The Strange Birthday Present"; Transliteration: "Uran-chan" (Japanese: ウランちゃん)	September 10, 1963	February 14, 1964
On his birthday, Astro Boy receives a little sister, Uran.
38	"The Out-of-Control Asteroid" / "The Asteroid Menace"; Transliteration: "Kurutta Shōwakusei" (Japanese: 狂った小惑星)	September 17, 1963	May 15, 1964
The small planet Mezusa goes out of its orbit and heads straight to the Earth. To save Earth from a collision with the planet, Astro Boy heads for Mezusa with a convict who is a bomb professional.
39	"Red Cat" / "The Mysterious Cat"; Transliteration: "Akai Neko" (Japanese: 赤い猫)	September 24, 1963	May 22, 1964
Dr. Shisoku despairs about human beings that continue the ongoing destruction of nature, and makes animals attack cities in a machine that hypnotizes with ultra short waves.
40	"Neo Caesar" / "The Abominable Snowman"; Transliteration: "Neo Shiza" (Japanese: ネオ・シーザー)	October 1, 1963	June 5, 1964
Sam Caesar, a mad scientist hopes to create a new Roman Empire.
41	"X Bomb" / "Deadline to Danger"; Transliteration: "Ekkusu Bakudan" (Japanese: X爆弾)	October 8, 1963	June 12, 1964
X Bomb, which is capable of turning any substance to water, drops into the Pacific Ocean. There are 50 hours left until the explosion. Astro Boy goes to recollect it, but learns that Uran, who has followed him, has been swallowed along with the bomb by a whale.
42	"The Yellow Horse"; Transliteration: "Kīroi Uma" (Japanese: 黄色い馬)	October 15, 1963	-
43	"His Highness Dead Cross" / "Ditto"; Transliteration: "Deddo Kurosu Denka" (Japanese: デッドクロス殿下)	October 22, 1963	June 26, 1964
President Ditto (President Rag) is the first robot to lead a nation. His creator Deadcross kidnaps him, and Astro Boy must expose his plot.
44	"The Egyptian Conspirators" / "Cleopatra's Heart"; Transliteration: "Ejiputo Inbō-dan" (Japanese: エジプト陰謀団)	October 29, 1963	July 3, 1964
Uran is kidnapped and made a hostage in an operation to steal Cleopatra's necklace from Astro Boy. The conspirators believe that whoever possesses the necklace can build the greatest empire in the world.
45	"Cleopatra's Necklace" / "Return of Cleopatra"; Transliteration: "Kureopatora no Kubikazari" (Japanese: クレオパトラの首飾り)	November 5, 1963	July 10, 1964
Conspirators obtain the coveted necklace, and at last set about conquering the world. Astro Boy stands in the way of their boss, Cleopatra.
46	"The Robot Spaceship" / "The Phantom Space Ship"; Transliteration: "Robotto Uchū-tei" (Japanese: ロボット宇宙艇)	November 12, 1963	July 17, 1964
The robot spaceship Lever Robot is stolen. Astro Boy is sent to retrieve it, but in the process has his energy stolen.
47	"The Cosmic Crab" / "The Gigantic Space Crab"; Transliteration: "Uchū Gani" (Japanese: 宇宙ガニ)	November 19, 1963	July 24, 1964
Astro must destroy a Cosmic Crab (Space Crab) from space.
48	"The Pegasus Tribe" / "The Great Space Horse"; Transliteration: "Tenba-zoku" (Japanese: 天馬族)	November 26, 1963	July 31, 1964
Nuu, member of the Tenma Tribe, comes from the depths of the mountains of Mongolia. People rush to the city just to see Nuu, throwing the city into a big chaos. Moreover, gangsters plot behind the scenes to capture Nuu.
49	"Transparent Giant" / "3D Tee Vee"; Transliteration: "Tōmei Kyojin" (Japanese: 透明巨人)	December 3, 1963	August 7, 1964
Dr. Hanabusa develops an electrical transmitter for substances. He gets into the machine for testing that his rival scientist breaks the machine, which makes Dr. Hanabusa an invisible man.
50	"Atom Goes to the West" / "Westward, Ha!"; Transliteration: "Atomu Seibu e iku" (Japanese: アトム西部へ行く)	December 10, 1963	August 14, 1964
Astro meets Heck Ben, a scientist's son who time travels back to the American wild west to be a cowboy.
51	"Little Elephant Pura" / "Jimbo the Great"; Transliteration: "Kozō Pura" (Japanese: 子象プーラ)	December 17, 1963	August 21, 1964
Astro Boy must help an elephant Pura (Jimbo) to get back to his home.
52	"Snow Lion" / "Snow Lion"; Transliteration: "Yuki Raion" (Japanese: 雪ライオン)	December 24, 1963	August 28, 1964
An old man who comes from Planet Regel to the Earth brings a snow lion with him. Then aliens from Planet Regel start to spray cosmic snow that sucks up all energy. Astro Boy takes off for space to save the Earth, when cities have stopped functioning.
53	"Goodbye 1963"; Transliteration: "Sayōnara Sen Kyūhyaku Roku San-nen" (Japanese: さようなら1963年)	December 31, 1963	-
54	"Duel on the Alps"; Transliteration: "Arupse no kettō" (Japanese: アルプスの決闘)	January 4, 1964	-
55	"Rejuvenating Gas"; Transliteration: "wakagaeri GASU" (Japanese: 若返りガス)	January 18, 1964	-
56	"Earth Defense Army" / "The Moon Monsters"; Transliteration: "chikyuu bouei tai" (Japanese: 地球防衛隊)	January 25, 1964	April 3, 1964
Astro joins forces with space troopers to battle aliens who have invaded the Moon. Note: This is the only episode with color.
57	"Robot School" / "Astro Boy goes to School"; Transliteration: "ROBOTTO gakkō" (Japanese: ロボット学校)	February 1, 1964	May 8, 1964
Humans can see the beauty of things and be impressed by them. In order to learn these feelings from the "heart", Astro, Uran and Lara start attending a robot school. But things go wrong for Astro when he inadvertently gets in trouble twice with the principal: first for a trick played by Lara, then again for trying to leave school during class (concerned for his teacher Miss Vina's safety). It leads to the principal holding Astro in detention by making him wear a dunce cap and stand in a corner. The further trouble Astro inadvertently gets into, the longer he remains in detention (all the way into the evening). Meanwhile, after school, Uran, Lara, and Miss Vina all end up captured by Al Mechanical.
58	"The 13 Mysterious Statues of God" / "The Island of Mystery"; Transliteration: "13 no kai kami zō" (Japanese: 13の怪神像)	February 8, 1964	June 19, 1964
Astro and Dr. Ochanomizu decipher an ancient code of 200,000 years ago. Discovering that hidden hints in the 13 statues of God in Western Island may all lead them to the secrets of outer space, they head for the island.
59	"The Robot Buron X" / "The Super Duper Robot"; Transliteration: "hakunetsu ningen" (Japanese: 白熱人間)	February 15, 1964	March 20, 1964
Gaston, who has stolen a blueprint of a robot from a UFO, requests the Science Ministry to build the robot exactly as shown on the blueprint, without indicating its source. The completed robot, Buron turns out to be a destructive weapon and starts to destroy everything.
60	"The Demon Bees" / "Dogma Palace"; Transliteration: "DAAMA no kyuuden" (Japanese: ダーマの宮殿)	February 22, 1964	August 29, 1964
Astro fights poisonous artificial bees.
61	"Space Parasites"; Transliteration: "uchuu no kiseichuu" (Japanese: 宇宙の寄生虫)	February 29, 1964	-
62	"The Phantom Ship" / "The Haunted Ship"; Transliteration: "yuureisen" (Japanese: 幽霊船)	March 7, 1964	December 28, 1963
Astro Boy and his pal Specs visit a carnival fun house where Specs is frightened by all the tricks played on them.
63	"The Artificial Iceberg" /"The Man-Made Iceberg"; Transliteration: "jinkō hyōzan" (Japanese: 人工氷山)	March 14, 1964	September 4, 1964
Dr. Zulu places a bomb in an artificial iceberg and tries to trigger a flood. Astro sets out to prevent the explosion.
64	"Count Bat" / "Vampire Vale"; Transliteration: "koumori hakushaku" (Japanese: こうもり伯爵)	March 21, 1964	September 11, 1964
Tick and Tack get lost in the depths of the Unzen Mountain, and decide to stay for a night in a deserted house inhabited by a vampire. The vampire, Dr. Pedan tries to turn Tick into a vampire, but Astro comes to rescue them.
65	"Brave Escapee" / "The Terrible Tidal Wave"; Transliteration: "yūkan na dassō mono" (Japanese: 勇敢な脱走者)	March 28, 1964	September 19, 1964
A massive tidal wave breaks. Astro flies up to stop the wave, but crashes into the sea. Then an escapee robot Boggy saves the unconscious Astro.
66	"The Space Viking" / "Vikings"; Transliteration: "SUPEESUBAIKINGU" (Japanese: スペースバイキング)	April 4, 1964	September 26, 1964
In order to rid the earth of space pirates, Astro destroys their mother ship. The pirates, however, are holding some hostages and demand that he withdraw.
67	"Heroes of the Night" / "The Devil Doll"; Transliteration: "yoru no yūshi tachi" (Japanese: ナイトの英雄)	April 11, 1964	October 3, 1964
While playing in the toy section, Uran imbues some toys with artificial intelligence. Among they are some with evil hearts. Astro asks the good toys to help him stop the bad dolls from doing misdeeds.
68	"Rebellion of the Dinosaur People" / "Dinosaur Dilemma"; Transliteration: "kyōryū nin no hanran" (Japanese: 恐龍人の反乱)	April 25, 1964	October 10, 1964
Astro is babysitting in an ancient amusement park when a dragon flies off with a small child. Then the dinosaurs demand food for ransom.
69	"The Secret of the Clock Tower" / "The Clock Tower Mystery"; Transliteration: "tokeitō no himitsu" (Japanese: 時計塔の秘密)	May 2, 1964	October 17, 1964
Dr. Temp, who has completed his killing beam machine, is planning to ruin the Conference of Scientists. Discovering the plot, Astro takes on the doctor.
70	"Rafflesia" / "The Flower Monster"; Transliteration: "RAFURESHIA" (Japanese: ラフレシア)	May 9, 1964	October 24, 1964
Rafflesia, the largest flower on earth, is found to be a plant man from outer space. This flower, which needs radioactivity to survive, is stronger than it looks, and even Astro is no match for it.
71	"The Last Day of Earth" / "Attack From Space"; Transliteration: "chikyū no saigo no hi" (Japanese: 地球最後の日)	May 16, 1964	October 31, 1964
Bem (Beamo), an alien fugitive disguises himself as a human to get away from his planet.
72	"7 Days of Drifting in Space" / "Shipwreck in Space"; Transliteration: "uchū no hyōryū 7 hiai" (Japanese: 宇宙の漂流7日間)	May 23, 1964	November 7, 1964
Astro is chasing gangs who run away by rocket. Then he finds them in a shelter station being attacked by aliens. He helps them, but finds himself drifting in space with them after the station is destroyed.
73	"Big Titan" / "Big Titan"; Transliteration: "BIGGUTAITAN" (Japanese: ビッグタイタン)	June 6, 1964	November 14, 1964
The daughter of Dr. Putt is kidnapped. When he sees Uran, who is a lookalike of his daughter, he takes Astro and his fellows for the kidnappers.
74	"Earth Expedition" / "Mission to the Middle of the World"; Transliteration: "chikyū tanken" (Japanese: 地球探検)	June 13, 1964	November 21, 1964
It is thought that a highly advanced civilization may exist underground. To test the hypothesis, Astro and Uran set out on an underground expedition. They get attacked by underground men.
75	"Flying City" / "Inca Gold Fever"; Transliteration: "sora tobu machi" (Japanese: 空とぶ町)	June 20, 1964	November 28, 1964
In order to collect the hidden treasures of the Inca scattered around the world, the old man Kapack, who has telekinesis, asks Tondale for help. Tondale, however, plans to get all the gold to himself, and starts an attack on the world with a special machine that enhances mental power.
76	"The Monster Machine" / "The Monster Machine"; Transliteration: "MONSUTAAMASHIIN" (Japanese: モンスターマシーン)	June 27, 1964	December 5, 1964
Dr. Morse succeeds in corresponding with Planet Paranoia, which is more civilized than the Earth. With the help of Astro, the doctor assembles a mysterious box following the instructions on a blueprint sent from the planet.
77	"Cape Town Lullaby" / "The Hooligan Whodunit"; Transliteration: "KEEPUTAUN no komoriuta" (Japanese: ケープタウンの子守歌)	July 4, 1964	December 12, 1964
A boy named "Looks" is deeply attached to the robot that has brought him up. From the day it is destroyed by another robot, he begins to hate all robots. Then he forms an exclusive organization called "Black Looks", and starts to oppress robots.
78	"The World in 500,000 Years" / "Funnel to The Future"; Transliteration: "50 man nen no chino sekai" (Japanese: 50万年後の世界)	July 11, 1964	December 19, 1964
Astro and his friends jump into the far future by accident. They see the cruel Pepper tribe treating their enemy tribes as slaves.
79	"Dr. Brain" / "Super Brain"; Transliteration: "DOKUTAA nou" (Japanese: ドクター脳)	July 18, 1964	December 26, 1964
Dr. Kanekura kills world famous brain surgeon Dr. Ibal, making it look like an accident. A strange robot named Friday follows him around. In truth, Dr. Ibal's brain waves are controlling the robot.
80	"Humanoid Bill" / "Mighty Minute"; Transliteration: "HYUUMANOIDOPIRU" (Japanese: ヒューマノイドピル)	July 25, 1964	January 2, 1965
Astro meets a strange creature in the wooded outskirts of Tokyo. It is a humanoid, a product of science. The humanoid named Bill does not know whether he is a creature or a machine.
81	"Dreaming Machine" / "Dream Machine"; Transliteration: "yumemiru kikai" (Japanese: 夢みる機械)	August 1, 1964	January 9, 1965
What kind of dreams do robots have? Astro participates in an experiment of a dream machine created by Dr. Poron, and becomes the first robot that dreams. In his dream, he turns into a human.
82	"Robot Olympics" / "The Robot Olympics"; Transliteration: "ROBOTTO kyōgitaikai" (Japanese: ロボット競技大会)	August 15, 1964	January 16, 1965
Astro participates in the Olympic games for robots, where he finds robots destroying other participants in a vicious act of sabotage.
83	"The Strange Bird, Garuda" / "Dunder, Bird of Doom"; Transliteration: "kaichou GARUDA" (Japanese: 怪鳥ガルダ)	August 22, 1964	January 23, 1965
Dr. Raja creates a robot bird. Then it comes flying over Japan. The bird Garuda demands Astro as a sacrifice.
84	"The Dolphin Civilization" / "Dolphins in Distress"; Transliteration: "IRUKA bunmei" (Japanese: イルカ文明)	August 29, 1964	January 30, 1965
Claiming to possess the ocean floor, Hall tries to build an autocratic submarine civilization. He starts to persecute the Dolphins. Astro stands up to preserve the peace on the ocean floor.
85	"The Demented Beltway" / "The Mad Beltway"; Transliteration: "kurutta BERUTOUEI" (Japanese: 狂ったベルトウェイ)	September 5, 1964	February 6, 1965
One of the latest means of traffic, the Beltway, is almost complete. However, someone tries to obstruct its construction, setting the site aflame. Astro sets off to protect the Beltway.
86	"The Time Gun" / "The Terrible Time Gun"; Transliteration: "jikan jū" (Japanese: 時間銃)	September 12, 1964	February 13, 1965
Dr. Tempo is waiting for a chance to become the next director of the Science Ministry. With a time gun that can send its targets to the past, he sends the bothersome Astro and Dr. Ochanomizu to the middle Ages.
87	"Princess Kaguya" / "Space Princess"; Transliteration: "shin kaguya hime" (Japanese: 新かぐや姫)	September 19, 1964	February 20, 1965
Astro exchanges messages with a star nymph, and sets out on an expedition to find the pure water the nymph needs. The star nymph is in fact Kaguya, a princess of the Planet Keios. Kaguya is trying to turn into a cocoon with pure water on a full moon night in preparation for emergence.
88	"The Bacteria Corps" / "Mighty Microbe Army"; Transliteration: "saikin butai" (Japanese: 細菌部隊)	September 26, 1964	February 27, 1965
The pilot of a rocket that has made an emergency landing is suffering from a strange disease. After they hear a voice from within the pilot's body, Astro and Higeoyaji are reduced to tiny figures, and get into the body. Inside, they see bacteria-sized aliens.
89	"Gomes' Ghost" / "Horrible King Horrid"; Transliteration: "GOMESU no bourei" (Japanese: ゴメスの亡霊)	October 3, 1964	March 6, 1965
Dr. Ochanomizu accepts a request to repair robots in the Scambo Empire. The robot he repairs however turns out to be the president of the Scambo Empire. The doctor's life is in danger, as he now knows the secret.
90	"The Robot Fortress" / "Mystery of the Amless Dam"; Transliteration: "ROBOTTO toride" (Japanese: ロボット砦)	October 10, 1964	March 13, 1965
A robot child has a fight with a human child, making the child cry. The humans become angry when they hear it, and a war breaks out between humans and robots.
91	"Garon's Counterattack" / "Galeom From Galaxy G"; Transliteration: "GARON gyakushū" (Japanese: ガロン逆襲)	October 24, 1964	March 19, 1965
Garon, the robot Astro sent back to space, comes back. Seeing Astro struggle hard to fend off Garon, the soldiers of the Earth Robot Army stand together to attack Garon.
92	"Three Robot Knights" / "The Three Robotiers"; Transliteration: "ROBOTTO sanjūshi" (Japanese: ロボット三銃士)	October 31, 1964	March 26, 1965
In order to save patients suffering from space disease on Mars, a serum is sent to Mars from Earth. All the transport ships carrying the serum, however, get destroyed on their way. Astro, together with the three robot knights, goes into space to protect the last of the serum.
93	"Cobalt" / "Brother Jetto"; Transliteration: "KOBARUTO" (Japanese: コバルト)	November 7, 1964	April 2, 1965
Cobalt (Jetto), a defective prototype of Astro built by Dr. Tenma, is released from storage and becomes Astro's older brother.
94	"Angel in the Alps" / "Angel of the Alps"; Transliteration: "aRUPUSU no tenshi" (Japanese: アルプスの天使)	November 14, 1964	April 9, 1965
The construction of a dam near the Bering Strait is hampered by difficulties. Dr. Zeman's research is required to solve the problem. Astro goes to ask for help from the doctor who lives a secluded life in the depth of the Alps because of his hatred for civilization. Astro, however, finds the doctor being attacked by another robot that is after the research material.
95	"The Evil Punch Card" / "Magic Punch Card"; Transliteration: "ma no PANCHIKAADO" (Japanese: 魔のパンチカード)	November 21, 1964	April 16, 1965
A missile base is completely controlled by a computer. Now, the computer is out of control, setting the stage for nuclear attack. In fact, it is a means of personal revenge by Dr. Yakoref, who lost the competition for the design of the base. Astro starts to disassemble the computer.
96	"Robot Future" / "The Great Rocket Robbery"; Transliteration: "ROBOTTOHYUUCHAA" (Japanese: ロボットヒューチャー)	November 28, 1964	April 23, 1965
Dr. Akuta, who is after the gold ingot on Mars, controls a robot called Future. The robot, however, becomes humble after hearing out Astro. Then Astro and Future pursue the doctor, who has run away with the gold ingot.
97	"Confrontation in Space" / "Contest in Space"; Transliteration: "uchū no taiketsu" (Japanese: 宇宙の対決)	December 5, 1964	April 30, 1965
Planet Hyper is the most civilized planet in the galactic system. It chooses a pair of a human and a robot each from both the Earth and Planet War to have them fight against each other, and will destroy the loser's planet. Astro and Ponkotsu Tetsu, the safebreaker, are chosen to represent the Earth.
98	"Zeo's Legacy" / "Gift of Zeo"; Transliteration: "ZEO no isan" (Japanese: ゼオの遺産)	December 12, 1964	May 7, 1965
A big robot is excavated from the construction site of a tunnel. It turns out to be a time capsule that was created to pass down information on a super ancient civilization of a million years ago to posterity.
99	"Little Columbus" / "A Deep Deep Secret"; Transliteration: "chiisana KORONBUSU" (Japanese: 小さなコロンブス)	December 19, 1964	May 14, 1965
Colon-bu-bu, the explorer of the underground state of Chombo, heads for the ground hoping to see a new world. Then he meets Cobalt and takes him underground as prisoner.
100	"The Robot House" / "The Wonderful Christmas Present"; Transliteration: "ROBOTTOHAUSU" (Japanese: ロボットハウス)	December 26, 1964	May 21, 1965
On Christmas night, Dr. Ochanomizu opens the will of his scientist friend who died 10 years before. It says that he has left an invention on Bururu Mountain. Astro and his friends happen to be on Bururu Mountain and encounter a boy called Akio who lives alone.
101	"The Unmapped World" / "Uncharted World"; Transliteration: "chizu ni nai sekai" (Japanese: 地図にない世界)	January 2, 1965	May 28, 1965
The visiting Prince Dorian of the Camellia Kingdom disappears. Astro goes searching for him using the latest 4D detection device, and finds the prince wandering in another world. The Uncharted World is inhabited by people who have been spirited away from various time periods.
102	"Queen of the Devils' Place" / "Jungle Mystery"; Transliteration: "makyō no joō" (Japanese: 魔境の女王)	January 9, 1965	June 4, 1965
Uran is going to be in a movie as Tarzan. When she goes on location to the jungle, however, a mysterious woman takes her away. The woman is planning to make Uran, who is dressed as a boy, the prince of the demon's place.
103	"Stairs Leading into Space" / "The Terrible Spaceman"; Transliteration: "uchū e no kaidan" (Japanese: 宇宙への階段)	January 16, 1965	June 11, 1965
Humans are drawn toward a flight of stairs that suddenly appear one day, and they start to walk towards a spaceship hidden among the clouds. When no humans are left on earth, the robots start to talk about taking over the planet.
104	"The Devil's Balloon"; Transliteration: "akuma no fūsen" (Japanese: 悪魔の風船)	January 23, 1965	-
A balloon of Atom starts flying over Metro City and children become so attracted that they go near the balloon and disappear. Due to these regular incidents, Atom is regarded as an enemy and his reputation gets destroyed. Atom then finds out that these balloons are made by Skunk Kusai.
105	"General Atom" / "General Astro"; Transliteration: "ATOMU shōgun" (Japanese: アトム将軍)	January 30, 1965	June 18, 1965
Astro is shot by a gun that ruins artificial intelligence. He loses all his memory, and is shot away into space.
106	"The Boy from Outer Space" / "The Mighty Mite From Ursa Minor"; Transliteration: "uchū kara kita shōnen" (Japanese: 宇宙から来た少年)	February 6, 1965	June 25, 1965
Hamegg sees a UFO in the woods that seems to have made an emergency landing, and finds an alien child. He notices the child's super strength, and plans to win the child's fame as a wrestler.
107	"Release of the Earth" / "Mystery of the Metal Men"; Transliteration: "chikyū kaihō" (Japanese: 地球解放)	February 13, 1965	July 2, 1965
Astro is involved in an explosion during the construction of a dam. The impact sends him into a parallel world where Tobio, the son of Dr. Tenma, never died in an accident. In other words, it is a world where Astro has not been born.
108	"Saturn Man" / "Super Human Beings"; Transliteration: "SATAANMAN" (Japanese: サターンマン)	February 20, 1965	July 9, 1965
Three scientists gain supernatural power on the surface of the Moon. Then Dr. Arden, who has a grudge against Dr. Ochanomizu, stages an attack against him. In order to protect Dr. Ochanomizu, Astro fights fiercely against the scientists who have supernatural power.
109	"Phoenix" / "Phoenix Bird"; Transliteration: "fushichō" (Japanese: 不死鳥)	February 27, 1965	July 16, 1965
Astro finds a big egg in a cave. He asks Dr. Ochanomizu to identify the egg, but they are unsuccessful. So Astro goes back to the island, where he encounters a strange bird that lives there.
110	"Expedition on Mercury" / "Menace from Mercury"; Transliteration: "suisei tanken" (Japanese: 水星探検)	March 6, 1965	July 23, 1965
Astro is investigating a super thermal bomb that has fallen on earth. Then he heads for Mercury to find its launching site. On his way, however, Astro loses his sight in an accident, and gets involved in a power struggle with aliens on Mercury.
111	"Robot Polymer"; Transliteration: "ROBOTTOPORIMAA" (Japanese: ロボットポリマー)	March 13, 1965	-
112	"Samson's Hair"; Transliteration: "SAMUSON no kami no ke" (Japanese: サムソンの髪の毛)	March 27, 1965	-
113	"'Back', the Country without Laughter" / "Dangerous Mission"; Transliteration: "warawanu BAKKU kuni" (Japanese: 笑わぬバック国)	April 3, 1965	July 30, 1965
A country called Back suddenly withdraws from the World Peace Union, and announces to its people a ban on invention and laughter. Astro and Dr. Ochanomizu visit the country to find out what is behind the dictatorial policy.
114	"Metro Monster"; Transliteration: "METOROMONSUTAA" (Japanese: メトロモンスター)	April 10, 1965	-
115	"The Big Runaway Safe"; Transliteration: "nigedashita taikin ko" (Japanese: 逃げだした大金庫)	April 17, 1965	-
116	"The Greatest Robot on Earth: Part 1"; Transliteration: "shijōsaidai no ROBOTTO (mae)" (Japanese: 史上最大のロボット(前))	April 24, 1965	-
A robot, Pluto is built to kill the 7 strongest robots in the world, therefore making him the world's most powerful robot.
117	"The Greatest Robot on Earth: Part 2"; Transliteration: "shijōsaidai no ROBOTTO (nochi)" (Japanese: 史上最大のロボット(後))	May 1, 1965	-
Pluto succeeds in disposing of Montblanc, North #2, Brando, Gesicht, Hercules, and Photar with ease, leaving Astro as his sole remaining target. After meeting Astro, he begins to question his actions.
118	"Robot Grabby"; Transliteration: "ROBOTTORAGUBII" (Japanese: ロボットラグビー)	May 8, 1965	-
119	"The Flying Lens" / "Planet 13"; Transliteration: "sora tobu RENZU" (Japanese: 空とぶレンズ)	May 15, 1965	August 6, 1965
Planet M, shaped like a convex lens, is approaching the Earth. It reflects solar light toward the Earth, turning its surface into hell. Humans, however, cannot cooperate in tackling the global issue because they are all motivated by their own greed.
120	"Time Hunter"; Transliteration: "TAIMUHANTAA" (Japanese: タイムハンター)	May 22, 1965	-
Time Hunter is the remake of the 11th episode of the series named "Time Machine".
121	"Ganimate" / "Prisoners in Space"; Transliteration: "GANIMEETO gō" (Japanese: ガニメート号)	May 29, 1965	August 13, 1965
Astro and Dr. Ochanomizu wander into a space graveyard that lies outside every sphere of gravitation, drifting in space. Then an earthling named Bemski, who hates the Earth, rescues them.
122	"The Monster Mantler"; Transliteration: "kaijū MANTORAA" (Japanese: モンスターマントラー)	June 5, 1965	-
123	"Captain Dog"; Transliteration: "DOGGU taichō" (Japanese: ドッグ隊長)	June 19, 1965	-
124	"Parting Gift" / "Double Trouble"; Transliteration: "okimiyage" (Japanese: おきみやげ)	July 3, 1965	August 20, 1965
Higeoyaji's pet dog Pero has a diamond that it took back from space. Dr. Fooler puts Pero's memory into the computer of Captain Dog, the robot dog, to make it find diamonds. Astro follows the robot dog, which is heading for Mars.

=== Japan only broadcasts ===
No.	Title	Original release date
125	"Find the Bacteria"; Transliteration: "saikin wo sagase" (Japanese: 細菌をさがせ)	July 10, 1965
126	"Roboids"; Transliteration: "ROBOIDO" (Japanese: ロボイド)	July 17, 1965
127	"The Experimental Robot"; Transliteration: "jikken ROBOTTO" (Japanese: 実験ロボット)	July 24, 1965
128	"Treasures of the Inca Empire"; Transliteration: "INKA teikoku no takara" (Japanese: インカ帝国の宝)	July 31, 1965
129	"Atom vs. Atom"; Transliteration: "ATOMU tai ATOMU" (Japanese: アトム対アトム)	August 14, 1965
130	"The Storm on Mars"; Transliteration: "kasei no arashi" (Japanese: 火星の嵐)	August 21, 1965
131	"The Moon Champion"; Transliteration: "MUUNCHANPION" (Japanese: ムーンチャンピオン)	August 28, 1965
132	"Prince Louis"; Transliteration: "RUI ouji" (Japanese: ルイ王子)	September 4, 1965
133	"Revenge After Ten Years"; Transliteration: "10 nen me no fukushū" (Japanese: 10年目の復讐)	September 11, 1965
134	"Operation Escape"; Transliteration: "dasshutsu sakusen" (Japanese: 脱出作戦)	September 18, 1965
135	"The Robot-Dog Backy"; Transliteration: "ROBOTTO inu BAKKII" (Japanese: ロボット犬バッキー)	September 25, 1965
136	"Inspector Jaguar"; Transliteration: "JAGAA keibu" (Japanese: ジャガー警部)	October 2, 1965
137	"Little Cooley"; Transliteration: "chīsai KUURII" (Japanese: 小さいクーリー)	October 9, 1965
138	"1 Long Day"; Transliteration: "nagai 1 hi" (Japanese: 長い1日)	October 16, 1965
139	"Atom Stolen"; Transliteration: "nusumareta ATOMU" (Japanese: 盗まれたアトム)	October 23, 1965
140	"The King and Atom"; Transliteration: "ōsama to ATOMU" (Japanese: 王様とアトム)	October 30, 1965
141	"The Locomotive March"; Transliteration: "kikansha kōshinkyoku" (Japanese: 機関車行進曲)	November 6, 1965
142	"Minya's Star"; Transliteration: "MIINYA no hoshi" (Japanese: ミーニャの星)	November 13, 1965
Astro Boy and other passengers from a doomed rocketliner are stranded on an asteroid with strange characteristics and a mysterious monster.
143	"Bird Street Story"; Transliteration: "BAADOSUTORIITO monogatari" (Japanese: バードストリート物語)	November 20, 1965
144	"Lost Friendship"; Transliteration: "ushinawareta yūjō" (Japanese: 失われた友情)	November 27, 1965
145	"Atom in the Deep Sea"; Transliteration: "ATOMU shinkai wo iku" (Japanese: アトム深海を行く)	December 4, 1965
146	"Report from the Future"; Transliteration: "mirai kara no hōkoku" (Japanese: 未来からの報告)	December 11, 1965
147	"Mid-air Screen"; Transliteration: "kūchū SUKURIIN" (Japanese: 空中スクリーン)	December 18, 1965
148	"Robio and Robiet"; Transliteration: "ROBIO to ROBIETTO" (Japanese: ロビオとロビエット)	December 25, 1965
149	"The Can Capriccio"; Transliteration: "KANDUME kyō sō kyoku" (Japanese: 缶カプリッチョ)	January 1, 1966
150	"Miss Magnet"; Transliteration: "MAGUNETTO-chan" (Japanese: マグネットちゃん)	January 8, 1966
151	"Lonely Atom"; Transliteration: "hitoribocchi no ATOMU" (Japanese: ひとりぼっちのアトム)	January 15, 1966
152	"The Robot Bombs"; Transliteration: "ROBOTTO bakudan" (Japanese: ロボット爆弾)	January 22, 1966
153	"The Red Merry-Go-Round"; Transliteration: "akai mokuba" (Japanese: 赤い木馬)	January 29, 1966
154	"Blue Bird Story"; Transliteration: "aoi tori monogatari" (Japanese: 青い鳥物語)	February 5, 1966
155	"The Crazed Boundary"; Transliteration: "kurutta kokkyōsen" (Japanese: 狂った国境線)	February 12, 1966
156	"Robot Mayor"; Transliteration: "ROBOTTO shichō" (Japanese: ロボット市長)	February 19, 1966
157	"Gypsy's Star"; Transliteration: "JIPUSHII no hoshi" (Japanese: ジプシーの星)	February 26, 1966
158	"Funny Companion"; Transliteration: "okashina michizure" (Japanese: おかしな道づれ)	March 5, 1966
159	"Devil and Angel"; Transliteration: "akuma to tenshi" (Japanese: 悪魔と天使)	March 19, 1966
160	"The Golden Flute"; Transliteration: "ōgon no FURUUTO" (Japanese: 黄金のフルート)	March 26, 1966
161	"Dream-Selling Aliens"; Transliteration: "yume wo uru uchūjin" (Japanese: 夢販売エイリアン)	April 2, 1966
162	"Operation Candy"; Transliteration: "KYANDEE sakusen" (Japanese: キャンデー作戦)	April 9, 1966
163	"Road to Another World"; Transliteration: "bessekai e no michi" (Japanese: 別世界への道)	April 16, 1966
164	"The Space Spider"; Transliteration: "uchū gumo" (Japanese: 宇宙ぐも)	April 23, 1966
165	"A Great Fuss Over Babies"; Transliteration: "akanbō sōdō" (Japanese: 赤ん坊騒動)	April 30, 1966
166	"The Jewel-Eating Monster"; Transliteration: "JUERU no ma zou" (Japanese: ジュエルの魔像)	May 7, 1966
167	"Plenty of Balloons"; Transliteration: "fuusen ga ippai" (Japanese: 風船がいっぱい)	May 14, 1966
168	"The Island That Jumped Up"; Transliteration: "odori agatta shima" (Japanese: おどりあがった島)	May 21, 1966
169	"Gift from the Future"; Transliteration: "miraijin no okurimono" (Japanese: 未来人の贈り物)	May 28, 1966
170	"Two Princesses"; Transliteration: "futari no ōjo" (Japanese: 二人の王女)	June 4, 1966
171	"Kutcher Forever"; Transliteration: "eien no KUCCHAA" (Japanese: 永遠のクッチャー)	June 11, 1966
172	"The Herald Brothers"; Transliteration: "HERARUDO kyōdai" (Japanese: ヘラルド兄弟)	June 25, 1966
173	"Robotty"; Transliteration: "ROBOTTI" (Japanese: ロボッティ)	July 2, 1966
174	"The Great Submarine Canal"; Transliteration: "kaitei daiun kawa" (Japanese: 海底大運河)	July 9, 1966
175	"Robot Wars (part one)" Transliteration: "ROBOTTO daisensō (mae)" (Japanese: ロボット大戦争(前))	July 23, 1966
176	"Robot Wars (part two)" Transliteration: "ROBOTTO daisensō (nochi)" (Japanese: ロボット大戦争(後))	July 30, 1966
177	"The Gigantic Robot"; Transliteration: "bakadekai ROBOTTO" (Japanese: ばかでかいロボット)	August 6, 1966
178	"Chi-tan's Nighttime Adventure"; Transliteration: "CHIITAN yoru no bōken" (Japanese: カイたんの夜間冒険)	August 20, 1966
179	"Blue Horseman: Part 1"; Transliteration: "ao kishi (mae)" (Japanese: 青騎士(前))	August 27, 1966
The Blue Knight is a hero among many robots for helping those who were treated poorly by humans. Humans avoid him out of fear.
180	"Blue Horseman: Part 2"; Transliteration: "ao kishi (nochi)" (Japanese: 青騎士(後))	September 3, 1966
Astro continues his conflict with The Blue Knight.
181	"Ghost Manufacturing Machine"; Transliteration: "yuurei seizouki (2 sakume)" (Japanese: 幽霊製造機)	September 10, 1966
The Ghost Manufacturing Machine is a remake of the 8th episode of the same name.
182	"Demented Cobalt"; Transliteration: "kurutta KOBARUTO" (Japanese: 狂ったコバルト)	September 24, 1966
183	"Japanese People from Space"; Transliteration: "uchū kara kita nihonjin" (Japanese: 宇宙から日本人)	October 1, 1966
This episode is the remake of the 7th episode "Captain Atom".
184	"Time War"; Transliteration: "TAIMU sensō" (Japanese: タイム戦争)	October 8, 1966
185	"Star of Africa"; Transliteration: "AFURIKA no hoshi" (Japanese: アフリカの星)	October 22, 1966
186	"Monsters Come out at Night"; Transliteration: "obake wa yoru kuru" (Japanese: おばけは夜来る)	October 29, 1966
187	"Baily's Legend"; Transliteration: "BEERII no densetsu" (Japanese: べーリーの伝説)	November 5, 1966
188	"Tengu of Kurama"; Transliteration: "kurama no tengu" (Japanese: 鞍馬の天狗)	November 19, 1966
189	"Confusion at the Shooting Studio"; Transliteration: "satsueijo sōdō" (Japanese: 撮影スタジオで混乱)	November 26, 1966
190	"Miracle of Mesopotamia"; Transliteration: "MESOPOTAMIA no kiseki" (Japanese: メソポタミアの奇蹟)	December 3, 1966
191	"Wandering Roppi"; Transliteration: "sasurai no ROPPI" (Japanese: さすらいのロッピ)	December 17, 1966
192	"Medusa's Mansion"; Transliteration: "MEDOSSA no kan" (Japanese: メドッサの館)	December 24, 1966
193	"The Greatest Adventure on Earth"; Transliteration: "chikyū saidai no bōken" (Japanese: 地球最大の冒険)	December 31, 1966

== Theme songs ==
In Japan, 3 different opening variants and 2 different ending variants were used within the anime. In the U.S., though, the same opening and ending was used.

=== Japan ===
Openings

1. "Mighty Atom Opening Theme Variant 1"
2. "Mighty Atom Opening Theme Variant 2" (includes singing)
3. "Mighty Atom Opening Theme Variant 3" (features Uran)
4. "Mighty Atom Opening Theme Variant 4"

Endings

1. "Mighty Atom Ending Theme Variant 1"
2. "Mighty Atom Ending Theme Variant 2" (features Uran)

=== United States ===
Openings

1. "Astro Boy Opening Theme"

Endings

1. "Astro Boy Ending Theme"

== Home video releases ==
=== Japan ===
==== VHS ====
Mighty Atom was released on VHS by Pony Video.

VHS Name	Episodes	Release Date
鉄腕アトム 地球防衛隊の巻	56. "Earth defense Army"	May 21, 1986

==== DVD ====
It was also released on DVD by Nippon Columbia.

DVD Name	Episodes	Release Date
鉄腕アトム DVD-BOX 1	1. "The Birth of Atom"; 2. "Frankenstein"; 3. "Adventure on Mars"; 4. "Guernica"; 5. "Sphinx"; 6. "Lightning Man"; 7. "Captain Atom"; 8. "Ghost Manufacturing Machine"; 9. "Black Looks"; 10. "The Fool Ivan"; 11. "Time Machine"; 12. "Cruciform Island"; 13. "The Eyes of Christ"; 14. "The Artificial Sun"; 15. "Plant People"; 16. "The White Vehicle Planet"; 17. "Robot Land"; 18. "Gadem"; 19. "Atom vs Garon"; 20. "Gaseous Beings"; 21. "Satellite R-45"; 22. "Sea Serpent Island"; 23. "The Mutant"; 24. "The Submarine Kingdom"; 25. "The Deep-Underground Tank"; 26. "Atlas"; 27. "Planet Pearl"; 28. "Mad Machine"; 29. "The Memorable Day"; 30. "Fuhrer ZZZ"	September 29, 2001
鉄腕アトム DVD-BOX 2	31. "The Black Cosmic Ray"; 32. "Hot Dog Corps"; 33. "Three Magicians"'; 34. "Midoro Marsh"; 35. "The Human Farm"; 36. "The Religion of Pui Pui"; 37. "Uran"; 38. "The Disturbed Small Planet"; 39. "Red Cat"; 40. "Neo Caesar"; 41. "X Bomb"; 42. "The Yellow Horse"; 43. "His Highness Dead Cross"; 44. "The Egyptian Conspiritors"; 45. "Cleopatra's Necklace"; 46. "The Robot Spaceship"; 47. "The Cosmic Crab"; 48. "The Tenma Tribe"; 49. "Transparent Giant"; 50. "Atom Goes to the West"; 51. "Little Elephant Pura"; 52. "Snow Lion"; 53. "Goodbye 1963"; 54. "Duel on the Alps"; 55. "Rejuvenating Gas"; 56. "Earth Defense Army"; 57. "Robot School"; 58. "The 13 Mysterious Statues of God"; 59. "The Robot Buron X"; 60. "The Demon Bees"	March 1, 2002
鉄腕アトム DVD-BOX 3	61. "Space Parasites"; 62. "The Phantom Ship"; 63. "The Artificial Iceberg"; 64. "Count Bat"; 65. "Brave Escapee"; 66. "The Space Viking"; 67. "Heroes of the Night"; 68. "Rebellion of the Dinosaur People"; 69. "The Secret of the Clock Tower"; 70. "Rafflesia"; 71. "The Last Day of Earth"; 72. "7 Days of Drifting in Space"; 73. "Big Titan"; 74. "Earth Expedition"; 75. "Flying City"; 76. "The Monster Machine"; 77. "Cape Town Lullaby"; 78. "The World in 500,000 Years"; 79. "Dr. Brain"; 80. "humanoid Bill"; 81. "Dreaming Machine"; 82. "Robot Olympics"; 83. "Garuda the Strange Bird"; 84. "The Dolphin Civilization"; 85. "The Demented Beltway"; 86. "The Time Gun"; 87. "Princess Kaguya"; 88. "The Bacteria Corps"; 89. "Gomes' Ghost"; 90. "The Robot Fortress"; 91. "Garon's Counterattack"; 92. "Three Robot Knights"; 93. "Cobalt"	August 31, 2002
鉄腕アトム DVD-BOX 4	94. "Angel in the Alps"; 95. "The Evil Punch Card"; 96. "Robot Future"; 97. "Confrontation in Space"; 98. "Zeo's Legacy"; 99. "Little Columbus"; 100. "The Robot House"; 101. "The Unmapped World"; 102. "Queen of the Devils' Place"; 103. "Stairs Leading into Space; 104. "The Devil's Balloon"; 105. "General Atom"; 106. "The Boy from Outer Space; 107. "Release of the Earth"; 108. "Saturn Man"; 109. "Phoenix"; 110. "Expedition on Mercury"; 111. "Robot Polymer"; 112. "Samson's Hair"; 113. "Back, the Country without Laughter"; 114. "Metro Monster"; 115. "The Big Runaway Safe"; 116. "The Greatest Robot on Earth (part one)"; 117. "The Greatest Robot on Earth (part two)"; 118. "Robot Grabby"; 119. "The Flying Lens"; 120. "Time Hunter"; 121. "Ganimate"; 122. "The Monster Mantler"; 123. "Captain Dog"; 124. "Parting Gift"; 125. "Find the Bacteria"; 126. "Roboids"	January 18, 2003
鉄腕アトム DVD-BOX 5	127. "The Experimental Robot"; 128. "Treasures of the Inca Empire"; 129. "Atom vs. Atom"; 130. "The Storm on Mars"; 131. "The Moon Champion"; 132. "Prince Louis"; 133. "Revenge After Ten Years"; 134. "Operation Escape"; 135. "The Robot-Dog Backy"; 136. "Inspector Jaguar"; 137. "Little Cooley"; 138. "1 Long Day"; 139. "Atom Stolen"; 140. "The King and Atom"; 141. "THe Locomotive March"; 142. "Minya's Star"; 143. "Bird Street Story"; 144. "Lost Friendship"; 145. "Atom in the Deep Sea"; 146. "Report from the Future"; 147. "Mid-air Screen"; 148. "Robio and Robiet"; 149. "The Can Capriccio"; 150. "Miss Magnet"; 151. "Lonely Atom"; 152. "The Robot Bombs"; 153. "The Red Merry-Go-Round"; 154. "Blue Bird Story"; 155. "The Crazed Boundary"; 156. "Robot Mayor"; 157. "Gypsy's Star"; 158. "Funny Companion"; 159. "Devil and Angel"	March 21, 2003
鉄腕アトム DVD-BOX 6	160. "The Golden Flute"; 161. "Dream-Selling Aliens"; 162. "Operation Candy"; 163. "Road to Another World"; 164. "The Space Spider"	

Separate sets of episodes were released as well.

DVD Name	Episodes	Release Date
鉄腕アトム ベスト・セレクション 誕生編	1. "The Birth of Atom"; 37. "Uran"; 93. "Cobalt"	March 21, 2003 July 23, 2008 (Limited Edition)
鉄腕アトム ベスト・セレクション ロボット編	82. "Robot Olympics"; 116. "The Greatest Robot on Earth (part one)"; 117. "The Greatest Robot on Earth (part two)"	March 21, 2003 July 23, 2008 (Limited Edition)
鉄腕アトム ベスト・セレクション 宇宙編	10. "The Fool Ivan"; 56. "Little Elephant Pura"; 71. "The Last Day of Earth"	March 21, 2003 July 23, 2008 (Limited Edition)
鉄腕アトム ベスト・セレクション 続ロボット編	179. "Blue Horseman (part one)"; 180. "Blue Horseman (part two)"; 126. "Roboids"	March 21, 2003 July 23, 2008 (Limited Edition)
鉄腕アトム ベスト・セレクション VS編	19. "Atom vs Garon"; 26. "Atlas"; 91. "Garon's Counterattack"	March 21, 2003 July 23, 2008 (Limited Edition)
鉄腕アトム ベスト・セレクション 名作編	9. "Black Looks"; 16. "The White Vehicle Planet"; 148. "Robio and Robiet"	March 21, 2003 July 23, 2008 (Limited Edition)

The episodes were placed in "Complete Box" Sets in 2008.

DVD Name	Episodes	Release Date
鉄腕アトム Complete Box 1	1. "The Birth of Atom"; 2. "Frankenstein"; 3. "Adventure on Mars"; 4. "Guernica"; 5. "Sphinx"; 6. "Lightning Man"; 7. "Captain Atom"; 8. "Ghost Manufacturing Machine"; 9. "Black Looks"; 10. "The Fool Ivan"; 11. "Time Machine"; 12. "Cruciform Island"; 13. "The Eyes of Christ"; 14. "The Artificial Sun"; 15. "Plant People"; 16. "The White Vehicle Planet"; 17. "Robot Land"; 18. "Gadem"; 19. "Atom vs Garon"; 20. "Gaseous Beings"; 21. "Satellite R-45"; 22. "Sea Serpent Island"; 23. "The Mutant"; 24. "The Submarine Kingdom"; 25. "The Deep-Underground Tank"; 26. "Atlas"; 27. "Planet Pearl"; 28. "Mad Machine"; 29. "The Memorable Day"; 30. "Fuhrer ZZZ"; 31. "The Black Cosmic Ray"; 32. "Hot Dog Corps"; 33. "Three Magicians"'; 34. "Midoro Marsh"; 35. "The Human Farm"; 36. "The Religion of Pui Pui"; 37. "Uran"; 38. "The Disturbed Small Planet"; 39. "Red Cat"; 40. "Neo Caesar"; 41. "X Bomb"; 42. "The Yellow Horse"; 43. "His Highness Dead Cross"; 44. "The Egyptian Conspiritors"; 45. "Cleopatra's Necklace"; 46. "The Robot Spaceship"; 47. "The Cosmic Crab"; 48. "The Tenma Tribe"; 49. "Transparent Giant"; 50. "Atom Goes to the West"; 51. "Little Elephant Pura"; 52. "Snow Lion"; 53. "Goodbye 1963"; 54. "Duel on the Alps"; 55. "Rejuvenating Gas"; 56. "Earth Defense Army"; 57. "Robot School"; 58. "The 13 Mysterious Statues of God"; 59. "The Robot Buron X"; 60. "The Demon Bees"; 61. "Space Parasites"; 62. "The Phantom Ship"; 63. "The Artificial Iceberg"; 64. "Count Bat"; 65. "Brave Escapee"; 66. "The Space Viking"; 67. "Heroes of the Night"; 68. "Rebellion of the Dinosaur People"; 69. "The Secret of the Clock Tower"; 70. "Rafflesia"; 71. "The Last Day of Earth"; 72. "7 Days of Drifting in Space"; 73. "Big Titan"; 74. "Earth Expedition"; 75. "Flying City"; 76. "The Monster Machine"; 77. "Cape Town Lullaby"; 78. "The World in 500,000 Years"; 79. "Dr. Brain"; 80. "humanoid Bill"; 81. "Dreaming Machine"; 82. "Robot Olympics"; 83. "Garuda the Strange Bird"; 84. "The Dolphin Civilization"; 85. "The Demented Beltway"; 86. "The Time Gun"; 87. "Princess Kaguya"; 88. "The Bacteria Corps"; 89. "Gomes' Ghost"; 90. "The Robot Fortress"; 91. "Garon's Counterattack"; 92. "Three Robot Knights"; 93. "Cobalt"	July 23, 2008
鉄腕アトム Complete Box 2	94. "Angel in the Alps"; 95. "The Evil Punch Card"; 96. "Robot Future"; 97. "Confrontation in Space"; 98. "Zeo's Legacy"; 99. "Little Columbus"; 100. "The Robot House"; 101. "The Unmapped World"; 102. "Queen of the Devils' Place"; 103. "Stairs Leading into Space; 104. "The Devil's Balloon"; 105. "General Atom"; 106. "The Boy from Outer Space; 107. "Release of the Earth"; 108. "Saturn Man"; 109. "Phoenix"; 110. "Expedition on Mercury"; 111. "Robot Polymer"; 112. "Samson's Hair"; 113. "Back, the Country without Laughter"; 114. "Metro Monster"; 115. "The Big Runaway Safe"; 116. "The Greatest Robot on Earth (part one)"; 117. "The Greatest Robot on Earth (part two)"; 118. "Robot Grabby"; 119. "The Flying Lens"; 120. "Time Hunter"; 121. "Ganimate"; 122. "The Monster Mantler"; 123. "Captain Dog"; 124. "Parting Gift"; 125. "Find the Bacteria"; 126. "Roboids"; 127. "The Experimental Robot"; 128. "Treasures of the Inca Empire"; 129. "Atom vs. Atom"; 130. "The Storm on Mars"; 131. "The Moon Champion"; 132. "Prince Louis"; 133. "Revenge After Ten Years"; 134. "Operation Escape"; 135. "The Robot-Dog Backy"; 136. "Inspector Jaguar"; 137. "Little Cooley"; 138. "1 Long Day"; 139. "Atom Stolen"; 140. "The King and Atom"; 141. "THe Locomotive March"; 142. "Minya's Star"; 143. "Bird Street Story"; 144. "Lost Friendship"; 145. "Atom in the Deep Sea"; 146. "Report from the Future"; 147. "Mid-air Screen"; 148. "Robio and Robiet"; 149. "The Can Capriccio"; 150. "Miss Magnet"; 151. "Lonely Atom"; 152. "The Robot Bombs"; 153. "The Red Merry-Go-Round"; 154. "Blue Bird Story"; 155. "The Crazed Boundary"; 156. "Robot Mayor"; 157. "Gypsy's Star"; 158. "Funny Companion"; 159. "Devil and Angel"	July 23, 2008

=== United States ===
==== VHS ====
Astro Boy was released on VHS by The Right Stuf.

VHS Name	Episodes	Release Date
Astro Boy 1	1. "Birth of Astro Boy"; 67. "The Monster Machine"	1989
Astro Boy 2	2. "Colosso"; 14. "One Million Mammoth Snails"	1989
Astro Boy 3	70. "Super Brain"; 81. "Mystery of the Amless Dam"	1989

It was also released under the "30th Anniversary Collector's Series" print.

VHS Name	Episodes	Release Date
Astro Boy 30th Anniversary Collector's Series Volume 1	55. "Vampire Vale"; 99. "Phoenix Bird"	September 22, 1993
Astro Boy 30th Anniversary Collector's Series Volume 2	44. "Cleopatra's Heart"; 69. "Funnel to the Future"	September 22, 1993
Astro Boy 30th Anniversary Collector's Series Volume 3	23. "The Deadly Flies"; 37. "Astro Boy Goes to School"	September 22, 1993
Astro Boy 30th Anniversary Collector's Series Volume 4	57. "The Vikings"; 96. "General Astro"	September 22, 1993
Astro Boy 30th Anniversary Collector's Series Volume 5	75. "Dolphins in Distress"; 91. "The Wonderful Christmas Present"	September 22, 1993

Episode 34, the "lost episode", was released on a single VHS tape.

VHS Name	Episodes	Release Date
Astro Boy: The Lost Episode	34. "The Beast From 20,000 Fathoms"	May 16, 1995

==== DVD ====
Two Ultra Collector's Edition DVDs were released by The Right Stuf, each containing 52 English dubbed episodes as well as many other features and extras.

DVD Name	Episodes	Release Date
Astro Boy – Ultra Collector's Edition DVD Set 1	1. "The Birth of Astro Boy"; 2. "Colosso"; 3. "Expedition to Mars"; 4. "The Sphinx"; 5. "Cross Island"; 6. "Grass Boy"; 7. "Zero, The Invisible Robot"; 8. "Silver Comet"; 9. "Hullabaloo Land"; 10. "The Spirit Machine"; 11. "Strange Voyage"; 12. "The Artificial Sun"; 13. "The Deep Freeze"; 14. "One Million Mammoth Snails"; 15. "Gangor, the Monster"; 16. "Secret Agent 3-Z"; 17. "The Haunted Ship"; 18. "Time Machine"; 19. "The Cosmic Giant"; 20. "Toxor, the Mist Man"; 21. "Satellite, R-45"; 22. "Sea-Serpent Isle"; 23. "The Deadly Flies"; 24. "Kingdom of the Sea"; 25. "The Strange Birthday Present"; 26. "Don Tay's Infernal Machine"; 27. "Pearl People"; 28. "The Wacky Machine"; 29. "Memory Day"; 30. "The Super Duper Robot"; 31. "Mysterious Cosmic Rays"; 32. "The Moon Monsters"; 33. "The Three Magicians"; 34. "The Beast From 20,000 Fathoms"; 35. "Planet X"; 36. "The Elixir of Life"; 37. "Astro Boy Goes to School"; 38. "The Asteroid Menace"; 39. "The Mysterious Cat"; 40. "The Abominable Snowman"; 41. "Deadline to Danger"; 42. "The Island of Mystery"; 43. "Ditto"; 44. "Cleopatra's Heart"; 45. "The Return of Cleopatra"; 46. "The Phantom Spaceship"; 47. "The Gigantic Space Crab"; 48. "The Great Space Horse"; 49. "3D Tee Vee"; 50. "Westward, Ha!"; 51. "Jimbo, the Great"; 52. "Snow Lion"	March 28, 2006
Astro Boy – Ultra Collector's Edition DVD Set 2	53. "Dogma Palace"; 54. "The Man-Made Iceberg"; 55. "Vampire Vale"; 56. "The Terrible Tidal Wave"; 57. "Vikings"; 58. "The Devil Doll"; 59. "Dinosaur Dilemma"; 60. "The Clock Tower Mystery"; 61. "The Flower Monster"; 62. "Attack From Space"; 63. "Shipwreck in Space"; 64. "Big Titan"; 65. "Mission to the Middle of the World"; 66. "Inca Gold Fever"; 67. "The Monster Machine"; 68. "The Hooligan Whodunnit"; 69. "Funnel to The Future"; 70. "Super Brain"; 71. "A Mighty Minute"; 72. "The Dream Machine"; 73. "The Robot Olympics"; 74. "Dunder, Bird of Doom"; 75. "Dolphins in Distress"; 76. "The Mad Beltway"; 77. "The Terrible Time Gun"; 78. "Space Princess"; 79. "Mighty Microbe Army"; 80. "Horrible King Horrid"; 81. "Mystery of Amless Dam"; 82. "Galeom From Galaxy G"; 83. "The Three Robotiers"; 84. "Brother Jetto"; 85. "Angel of the Alps"; 86. "Magic Punch Card"; 87. "The Great Rocket Robbery"; 88. "Contest in Space"; 89. "Gift of Zeo"; 90. "A Deep, Deep Secret"; 91. "The Wonderful Christmas Present"; 92. "Uncharted World"; 93. "Jungle Mystery"; 94. "The Terrible Spaceman"; 95. "The Mighty Mite From Ursa Minor"; 96. "General Astro"; 97. "Mystery of the Metal Men"; 98. "Super Human Beings"; 99. "Phoenix Bird"; 100. "Menace from Mercury"; 101. "Dangerous Mission"; 102. "Planet 13"; 103. "Prisoners in Space"; 104. "Double Trouble"	August 29, 2006

They were re-released in Mini Collection sets 3 years later.

DVD Name	Episodes	Release Date
Astro Boy DVD Mini Collection 1	1. "Birth of Astro Boy"; 2. "Colosso"; 3. "Expedition to Mars"; 4. "The Sphinx"; 5. "Cross Island"; 6. "Grass Boy"; 7. "Zero, The Invisible Robot"; 8. "Silver Comet"; 9. "Hullabaloo Land"; 10. "The Spirit Machine"; 11. "Strange Voyage"; 12. "The Artificial Sun"; 13. "The Deep Freeze"; 14. "One Million Mammoth Snails"; 15. "Gangor, the Monster"; 16. "Secret Agent 3-Z"; 17. "The Haunted Ship"; 18. "Time Machine"; 19. "The Cosmic Giant"; 20. "Toxor, the Mist Man"; 21. "Satellite, R-45"; 22. "Sea-Serpent Isle"; 23. "The Deadly Flies"; 24. "Kingdom of the Sea"; 25. "The Strange Birthday Present"	October 6, 2009
Astro Boy DVD Mini Collection 2	26.	October 6, 2009

A DVD containing the first 5 episodes was also released.

DVD Name	Episodes	Release Date
Astro Boy: the Beginning	1. "Birth of Astro Boy"; 2. "Colosso"; 3. "Expedition to Mars"; 4. "The Sphinx"; 5. "Cross Island"	October 6, 2009
