= Pluto (Japanese TV series) =

2023 anime television series

- Key visual
- Genre: Mystery; Science fiction thriller; Superhero
- Created by: Naoki Urasawa
- Original net animation
- Directed by: Toshio Kawaguchi
- Produced by: Shintarou Maruyama; Yuushi Ikou; Sumio Udagawa; Ge Yangqin
- Written by: Heisuke Yamashita; Tatsurou Inamoto
- Music by: Yugo Kanno
- Studio: Studio M2
- Licensed by: Netflix
- Released: October 26, 2023
- Runtime: 56–71 minutes
- Episodes: 8
- icon

Pluto is a Japanese eight-episode original net animation (ONA) produced by Genco with animation by Studio M2. Written by Heisuke Yamashita and Tatsurou Inamoto, it is based on the Pluto: Urasawa x Tezuka manga series by Naoki Urasawa and Takashi Nagasaki, in turn based on the story arc "The Greatest Robot on Earth" from Osamu Tezuka's Astro Boy. The series was released in full on Netflix on October 26, 2023.

== Premise ==
The series follows the Europol robot detective Gesicht in his attempts to solve the case of a string of robot and human deaths around the world where all the victims have objects shoved into or positioned by their heads, imitating horns. The case becomes more puzzling when evidence suggests a robot is responsible for the murders, which would make it the first time a robot has killed a human in eight years. All seven of the great robots of the world (the most scientifically advanced, which have the potential to become weapons of mass destruction) seem to be the killer's targets, and the murdered humans are connected to preserving the International Robot Laws, which grant robots equal rights.

== Characters ==
Gesicht (ゲジヒト, Gejihito; German for "face")
Voiced by: Shinshū Fuji (Japanese); Jason Vande Brake (English)
A German robot inspector working for Europol. His body is made out of an alloy called "zeronium", and he is capable of firing a devastating blast using the alloy as shell. He and his wife, Helena, both have a human appearance.
Atom (アトム, Atomu)
Voiced by: Yoko Hikasa (Japanese); Laura Stahl (English)
A Japanese boy robot who was formerly the peace ambassador toward the end of the 39th Central Asian War. His artificial intelligence and sensors are more advanced than the other seven great robots of the world.
Epsilon (エプシロン, Epushiron)
Voiced by: Mamoru Miyano (Japanese); Keith Silverstein (English)
An Australian photon-powered gentle and sensitive robot with a pacifist outlook. He runs an orphanage to take care of war orphans. Epsilon chose not to fight during the 39th Central Asian War.
Hercules (ヘラクレス, Herakuresu)
Voiced by: Rikiya Koyama (Japanese); Richard Epcar (English)
A Greek robot pankration wrestler with a high sense of honor and bravery. He and Brando have been rivals and friends since the 39th Central Asian War.
Brando (ブランド, Burando)
Voiced by: Hidenobu Kiuchi (Japanese); Adrian Pasdar (English)
A Turkish robot pankration wrestler with a great devotion to his robot wife and his five human children. He fought alongside Mont Blanc and Hercules in the 39th Central Asian War.
North No. 2 (ノース2号, Nōsu Ni-gō)
Voiced by: Koichi Yamadera (Japanese); Patrick Seitz (English)
A Scottish robot with six mechanical armed arms, formerly one of the most powerful fighting robots during the 39th Central Asian War. He prefers not to fight, choosing instead to work as the butler of Paul Duncan, a blind renowned composer.
Mont Blanc (モンブラン, Mon Buran)
Voiced by: Hiroki Yasumoto (Japanese); Keythe Farley (English)
A Swiss mountain guide robot that is killed at the beginning of the story. He fought in the 39th Central Asian War. Loved by humans, many mourned for him.
Uran (ウラン)
Voiced by: Minori Suzuki (Japanese); Lisa Reimold (English)
Ochanomizu's masterpiece and Atom's robot younger sister who can sense human, animal, and robot emotions.
Brau 1589 (ブラウ1589, Burau 1589)
Voiced by: Hideyuki Tanaka (Japanese); SungWon Cho (English)
The robot that killed a human eight years prior to the story. He is imprisoned in an artificial intelligence correctional facility, where Gesicht visits him to get an idea of the killer he is trying to track down.
Helena (ヘレナ, Herena)
Voiced by: Romi Park (Japanese); Mara Junot (English)
Gesicht's wife; like him, she is also a human-presenting robot.
Professor Tenma (天馬博士, Tenma-hakase)
Voiced by: Eizou Tsuda (Japanese); Keith David (English)
A genius robotics scientist and former head of Japan's Ministry of Science. He created Atom and is the authority on artificial intelligence.
Professor Ochanomizu (お茶の水博士, Ochanomizu-hakase)
Voiced by: Toshio Furukawa (Japanese); Mike Pollock (English)
A Japanese robotics scientist and current head of Japan's Ministry of Science. He is the creator of Uran and also looks after Atom. He was a member of the Bora Survey Group, a UN-dispatched group of inspectors sent to Persia to look for robots of mass destruction.
Paul Duncan (ポール・ダンカン)
Voiced by: Michio Hazama (Japanese); Ron Bottitta (English)
The blind musician who North No. 2 serves as his butler.
Professor Hoffman (ホフマン博士, Hofuman-hakase)
Voiced by: Hiroshi Yanaka (Japanese); Michael Sinterniklaas (English)
The creator of zeronium and Gesicht.
Professor Abullah (アブラー博士, Aburā-hakase)
Voiced by: Kazuhiro Yamaji (Japanese); Kamran Nikhad (English)
The head of the Persian Ministry of Science, who lost most of his body and his family in the 39th Central Asian War, with most of his body now being robotic replacements.
Dr. Roosevelt (Dr. ルーズベルト, Dokutā Rūzuberuto)
Voiced by: Marina Inoue (Japanese); Melissa Hutchison (English)
A powerful sentient supercomputer, belonging to the United States of Thracia, whose only avatar to the outside world is a teddy bear.
Adolf Haas (アドルフ・ハース, Adorufu Hāsu)
Voiced by: Masafumi Kimura (Japanese); Nolan North (English)
A German trader who is a member of the anti-robot group, KR, and suspects that Gesicht killed his brother.
President Alexander (アレクサンダー大統領, Arekusandā-daitōryō)
Voiced by: Kenyu Horiuchi (Japanese); Kiff VandenHeuvel (English)
The president of the United States of Thracia.
Pluto (プルートウ, Purūto)
Voiced by: Toshihiko Seki (Japanese); Fred Tatasciore (English)
An extremely powerful robot created to destroy the seven robots classified as weapons of mass destruction.
Inspector Tawashi (田鷲警部, Tawashi-keibu)
Voiced by: Takaya Hashi (Japanese); Michael Sorich (English)
A bald Japanese inspector who works with Atom.
Inspector Nakamura (中村警部, Nakamura-keibu)
Voiced by: Yutaka Aoyama (Japanese); Bill Chott (English)
A Japanese inspector who works with Atom.
Schelling (シュリング, Sheringu)
Voiced by: Kiyomitsu Mizuuchi (Japanese); Kirk Thornton (English)
Hoffman's boss and by proxy, Gesicht's.
Wassily (ワシリー, Washirī)
Voiced by: Chiyuki Miura (Japanese); Cherami Leigh (English)
A child orphaned by the 39th Central Asian War, who is taken in by Epsilon.
Mine (ミネ)
Voiced by: Rie Takahashi (Japanese); Marissa Lenti (English)
Brando's wife.
Becker (ベッカー, Bekkā)
Voiced by: Tsuguo Mogami (Japanese); Keythe Farley (English)
A German police captain and Gesicht's supervisor on the field.
Ilsa Haas (イルサ・ハス, Irusa Hāsu)
Voiced by: Chika Fujimura (Japanese); Erica Schroeder (English)
Adolf's wife who despised her brother in-law for being serial killer of robot children.
Hans Haas (ハンス・ハス, Hansu Hāsu)
Voiced by: Arisa Sekine (Japanese); Greg Vinciguerra (English)
Adolf's son who is fascinated with robots.
Principal Ban (伴校長先生, Ban–kōchō sensei)
Voiced by: Wataru Takagi (Japanese); Paul St. Peter (English)
The principal at Uran's school and confidant to her.
Arnold (アーノルド, Ānorudo)
Voiced by: Yuuki Hoshi (Japanese); Eric Bauza (English)
A robot working as a meteorologist and an acquaintance to Epsilon.
Sahad (サハド, Sahado)
Voiced by: Toshihiko Seki (Japanese); Sean Rohani (English)
A robot created by Professor Abullah and treated as his own son after the death of his whole family.
Darius XIV (ダリウス14世, Dariusu 14-sei)
Voiced by: Shōzō Iizuka (episodes 4–5), Yasuhiro Mamiya (episode 8) (Japanese); Zuhair Haddad (English)
The last king of Persia who is charged with war crimes in 39th Central Asian war.
Inspector Wallace (ワラス警部, Warasu-keibu)
Voiced by: Jiro Saito (Japanese); Jamieson Price (English)
A senior inspector who works with Atom.
Professor Reinhardt (ラインハルト教授, Rainharuto-hakase)
Voiced by: Ikkyu Juku (Japanese); John Snyder (English)
Mont Blanc's kind hearted elderly creator.
Dr. Schiller (シラー博士, Shirā-hakase)
Voiced by: Yasuhiko Kawazu (Japanese); Paul St. Peter (English)
Fersen (フェルゼン, Feruzen)
Voiced by: Daichi Endo (Japanese); Jason Marnocha (English)
Goji (ゴジ)
Voiced by: Masami Iwasaki (Japanese); Cam Clarke (English)
A Persian genius scientist, whose entire existence is questionable.
Yujiro (裕次郎)
Voiced by: Kenji Hamada (Japanese); Isaac Robinson-Smith (English)
A police officer robot assigned to guard Ochanomizu.
Detective Lieman (リーマン刑事, Rīman-deka)
Voiced by: Kengo Tsujii (Japanese); Paul St. Peter (English)
Takashi (たかし)
Voiced by: Mariko Nagai (Japanese); Jessica DiCicco (English)
Ochanomizu's grandson who had robot dog named Bobby.
Yamagishi (山岸)
Voiced by: Masamichi Kitada (Japanese); Elias Toufexis (English)
Colonel Armstrong (アームストロング大佐, Āmusutorongu-taisa)
Voiced by: Yasuhiro Mamiya (Japanese); Christopher Sabat (English)
A colonel in charge of the top-security prison where Darius XIV is incarcerated.
Meyer (マイヤー, Maiyā)
Voiced by: Takeshi Hirabayashi (Japanese); Marc Thompson (English)
Muhammed Ali (モハメド・アリ, Mohamedo Ari)
Voiced by: Wakana Minami (Japanese); Christina Costello (English)
A low level robot in Persia who sells flowers and follows Gesicht.
Hogan (ホーガン)
Voiced by: Kōsuke Takaguchi (Japanese); Imari Williams (English)
A robot assigned to be Epsilon's bodyguard.
General Scott (スコット将軍, Sukotto shōgun)
Voiced by: Kenichirou Matsuda (Japanese); Jamieson Price (English)
An army general who worked with Epsilon to cleanse the remains of robots felled in the war.
Kurt (カート, Kāto)
Voiced by: Yuna Ogata (Japanese); Colleen O'Shaughnessey (English)
A young child rescued by Gesicht during a case.
Simon (サイモン, Saimon)
Voiced by: Mitsuru Ogata (Japanese); Joe Ochman (English)
A board member at Epsilon's orphanage.
Johansen (ヨハンセン, Yohansen)
Voiced by: Zenki Kitajima (Japanese); Robert Clotworthy (English)
A man ordered by Professor Abullah to retrieve Wassily from foster care.

== Production ==
An anime adaptation of the Japanese manga series Pluto: Urasawa x Tezuka was announced to be in production by Studio M2 at the 2017 Annecy International Animated Film Festival in June. In May 2022, the adaptation was confirmed to still be in production by Studio M2 founder Masao Maruyama. Toshio Kawaguchi is the series' director, with Urasawa as creative advisor, Shigeru Fujita designed the characters and serves as supervising animation director, and Yugo Kanno composing the music. The series made its premiere exclusively on Netflix on October 26, 2023, and consisted of eight episodes. Each episode was produced with assistance from another studio and adapts one of the manga volumes.

== Episodes ==
No.	Title	Directed by (Note: Information is taken from the ending credits of each episode.)	Written by	Storyboarded by	Assistant studio	Original release date
1	"Episode 1"	Hiromichi Matano; Masaru Matsuse; Fumihiro Yoshimura	Heisuke Yamashita	Masayuki Kojima; Hiroyuki Okiura	Tezuka Productions	October 26, 2023
A beloved Swiss robot is found blown into pieces. Meanwhile, Europol robot inspector Gesicht investigates another eerily related murder.
2	"Episode 2"	Takahiro Umehara	Heisuke Yamashita	Takahiro Umehara	DR Movie	October 26, 2023
Another horned corpse is found. Gesicht reaches out to Atom, the most advanced of the seven robots, to help analyze the serial murders.
3	"Episode 3"	Yoshie Takagi	Tatsurou Inamoto	Masaru Matsuse; Nanako Shimazaki	BILBA	October 26, 2023
Abullah gets summoned by police superintendent Tawashi regarding Tazaki's murder. Gesicht starts to suspect that his data may be compromised.
4	"Episode 4"	Eom Sang-Yong; Nanako Shimazaki	Tatsurou Inamoto	Masayuki Sakoi	DR Movie	October 26, 2023
Professor Ochanomizu brings a battered robot dog home and attempts to fix it. Soon after, a mysterious man claiming to be the owner visits his house.
5	"Episode 5"	Kento Shintani; Yasutomo Okamoto	Heisuke Yamashita	Kou Matsuo; Satoshi Nishimura	MAPPA	October 26, 2023
After delivering Adolf Haas to a safe house, Gesicht looks into his past. Meanwhile, Hercules and Epsilon sense a mysterious threat approaching them.
6	"Episode 6"	Yasutomo Okamoto; Kōnosuke Uda	Heisuke Yamashita	Yasutomo Okamoto; Takeru Satou	MAPPA	October 26, 2023
Gesicht meets Abullah in Persia to further investigate the case, but detects a lie. He inches closer to the truth when he encounters a robot child.
7	"Episode 7"	Hiroshi Aoyama	Tatsurou Inamoto	Satoshi Nishimura	Studio VOLN; Colored-Pencil Animation Design	October 26, 2023
Dr. Tenma attempts to bring Atom back at all costs. A government official advises a distressed Epsilon to evacuate since he's the next target.
8	"Episode 8"	Fumihiro Yoshimura	Tatsurou Inamoto	Masayuki Kojima	Tezuka Productions	October 26, 2023
Professor Ochanomizu closely monitors Atom's erratic behavior. Dr. Tenma confronts his past and the truth unravels, triggering a world destroying threat.

== Reception ==
=== Critical response ===
The series received positive reviews from critics. Ali Griffiths of Digital Spy said, "Pluto sets a new gold standard for Netflix original anime." Devin Meenan of Slashfilm compared the complexity and characters to the graphic novel Watchmen. Elijah Gonzalez of Paste magazine applauded the story's fresh takes on themes first introduced in Isaac Asimov's laws of robotics. Joshua Rivera of Polygon called Pluto "one of the best sci-fi murder mysteries you can watch this year".

=== Accolades ===
Year	Award	Category	Recipient	Result	Ref.
2024	4th Astra TV Awards	Best Anime Series	Pluto	Nominated	
2025	9th Crunchyroll Anime Awards	Best Drama	Pluto	Nominated	
2025	9th Crunchyroll Anime Awards	Best Background Art	Pluto	Nominated	
