= Pluto: Urasawa x Tezuka =

Japanese manga series

- First tankōbon volume cover, featuring Gesicht
- Genre: Mystery; Science fiction thriller; Superhero
- Created by: Osamu Tezuka
- Manga
- Written by: Naoki Urasawa; Takashi Nagasaki
- Illustrated by: Naoki Urasawa
- Published by: Shogakukan
- English publisher: NA: Viz Media
- Magazine: Big Comic Original
- Original run: September 5, 2003 – April 4, 2009
- Volumes: 8
- Adaptation
- Pluto (2023)
- icon

Pluto: Urasawa x Tezuka (stylized in all caps), or simply Pluto, is a Japanese manga series written and illustrated by Naoki Urasawa. It was serialized in Shogakukan's seinen manga magazine Big Comic Original from September 2003 to April 2009, with its chapters collected into eight tankōbon volumes. The series is based on Osamu Tezuka's Astro Boy, specifically "The Greatest Robot on Earth" story arc, and named after the arc's chief villain. Urasawa reinterprets the story as a suspenseful murder mystery starring Gesicht, a Europol robot detective trying to solve the case of a string of robot and human deaths. Takashi Nagasaki is credited as the series' co-author. Macoto Tezka, Tezuka's son, supervised the series, and Tezuka Productions is listed as having given cooperation.

The series was licensed and released in English in North America by Viz Media. A play adaptation directed by Sidi Larbi Cherkaoui opened in January 2015 and has been performed internationally. An original net animation (ONA) adaptation, produced by Genco with animation production services by Studio M2, premiered in its entirety on Netflix in October 2023.

Pluto was a critical and commercial success, winning several awards, including the ninth Tezuka Osamu Cultural Prize, and selling over 10 million copies.

== Plot ==
Pluto follows the Europol robot detective Gesicht in his attempts to solve the case of a string of robot and human deaths around the world where all the victims have objects shoved into or positioned by their heads, imitating horns. The case becomes more puzzling when evidence suggests a robot is responsible for the murders, which would make it the first time a robot has killed a human in eight years. All seven of the great robots of the world (the most scientifically advanced, which have the potential to become weapons of mass destruction) seem to be the killer's targets, and the murdered humans are connected to preserving the International Robot Laws, which grant robots equal rights.

== Characters ==
Gesicht (ゲジヒト, Gejihito; German for "face")
A German robot inspector working for Europol. His body is made out of an alloy called "zeronium", and he is capable of firing a devastating blast using the alloy as shell. He and his wife, Helena, both have a human appearance.
Atom (アトム, Atomu)
A Japanese boy robot who was formerly the peace ambassador toward the end of the 39th Central Asian War. His artificial intelligence and sensors are more advanced than the other seven great robots of the world.
Epsilon (エプシロン, Epushiron)
An Australian photon-powered gentle and sensitive robot with a pacifist outlook. He runs an orphanage to take care of war orphans. Epsilon chose not to fight during the 39th Central Asian War.
Hercules (ヘラクレス, Herakuresu)
A Greek robot pankration wrestler with a high sense of honor and bravery. He and Brando have been rivals and friends since the 39th Central Asian War.
Brando (ブランド, Burando)
A Turkish robot pankration wrestler with a great devotion to his robot wife and his five human children. He fought alongside Mont Blanc and Hercules in the 39th Central Asian War.
North No. 2 (ノース2号, Nōsu Ni-gō)
A Scottish robot with six mechanical armed arms, formerly one of the most powerful fighting robots during the 39th Central Asian War. He prefers not to fight, choosing instead to work as the butler of Paul Duncan, a blind renowned composer.
Mont Blanc (モンブラン, Mon Buran)
A Swiss mountain guide robot that is killed at the beginning of the story. He fought in the 39th Central Asian War. Loved by humans, many mourned for him.
Uran (ウラン)
Ochanomizu's masterpiece and Atom's robot younger sister who can sense human, animal, and robot emotions.
Brau 1589 (ブラウ1589, Burau 1589)
The robot that killed a human eight years prior to the story. He is imprisoned in an artificial intelligence correctional facility, where Gesicht visits him to get an idea of the killer he is trying to track down.
Helena (ヘレナ, Herena)
Gesicht's wife; like him, she is also a human-presenting robot.
Professor Tenma (天馬博士, Tenma-hakase)
A genius robotics scientist and former head of Japan's Ministry of Science. He created Atom and is the authority on artificial intelligence.
Professor Ozhanomizu (お茶の水博士, Ochanomizu-hakase)
A Japanese robotics scientist and current head of Japan's Ministry of Science. He is the creator of Uran and also looks after Atom. He was a member of the Bora Survey Group, a UN-dispatched group of inspectors sent to Persia to look for robots of mass destruction.
Paul Duncan (ポール・ダンカン)
The blind musician who North No. 2 serves as his butler.
Professor Hoffman (ホフマン博士, Hofuman-hakase)
The creator of zeronium and Gesicht.
Professor Abullah (アブラー博士, Aburā-hakase)
The head of the Persian Ministry of Science, who lost most of his body and his family in the 39th Central Asian War, with most of his body now being robotic replacements.
Dr. Roosevelt (Dr. ルーズベルト, Dokutā Rūzuberuto)
A powerful sentient supercomputer, belonging to the United States of Thracia, whose only avatar to the outside world is a teddy bear.
Adolf Haas (アドルフ・ハース, Adorufu Hāsu)
A German trader who is a member of the anti-robot group, KR, and knows that Gesicht killed his brother.
President Alexander (アレクサンダー大統領, Arekusandā-daitōryō)
The president of the United States of Thracia.
Pluto (プルートウ, Purūto)
An extremely powerful robot created to destroy the seven robots classified as weapons of mass destruction.
Inspector Tawashi (田鷲警部, Tawashi-keibu)
A bald Japanese inspector who works with Atom.
Inspector Nakamura (中村警部, Nakamura-keibu)
A Japanese inspector who works with Atom.
Schelling (シュリング, Sheringu)
Hoffman's boss and by proxy, Gesicht's.
Becker (ベッカー, Bekkā)
A German police captain and Gesicht's supervisor on the field.
Sahad (サハド, Sahado)
A robot created by Professor Abullah and treated as his own son after the death of his whole family.
Darius XIV (ダリウス14世, Dariusu 14-sei)
The last king of Persia who is charged with war crimes in 39th Central Asian war.
Inspector Wallace (ワラス警部, Warasu-keibu)
Professor Reinhardt (ラインハルト教授, Rainharuto-hakase)
Mont Blanc's kind hearted elderly creator.
Goji (ゴジ)
A Persian genius scientist, whose entire existence is questionable.
Yujiro (裕次郎)
A police officer robot assigned to guard Ochanomizu.

== Production ==
Naoki Urasawa and Takashi Nagasaki began Pluto after over a year of negotiating to get the rights to adapt Osamu Tezuka's Astro Boy. With Astro/Atom's official birth date of April 7, 2003 approaching, Urasawa was initially going to do a limited or one-off manga in celebration. But due to the character's importance, he suggested a long-term "serious" take on "The Greatest Robot on Earth" (地上最大のロボット, Chijō Saidai no Robotto) arc, which is his favorite. After re-reading it, he felt that some scenes were missing or different than he remembered, before realizing that he had created his own version of the story in his head. Initially, Urasawa had pitched the idea as if someone else would create it. After many people, including Nagasaki, told him he should be the one to do it, Urasawa said the idea that resulted from story discussions seemed "too good to let anybody else do."

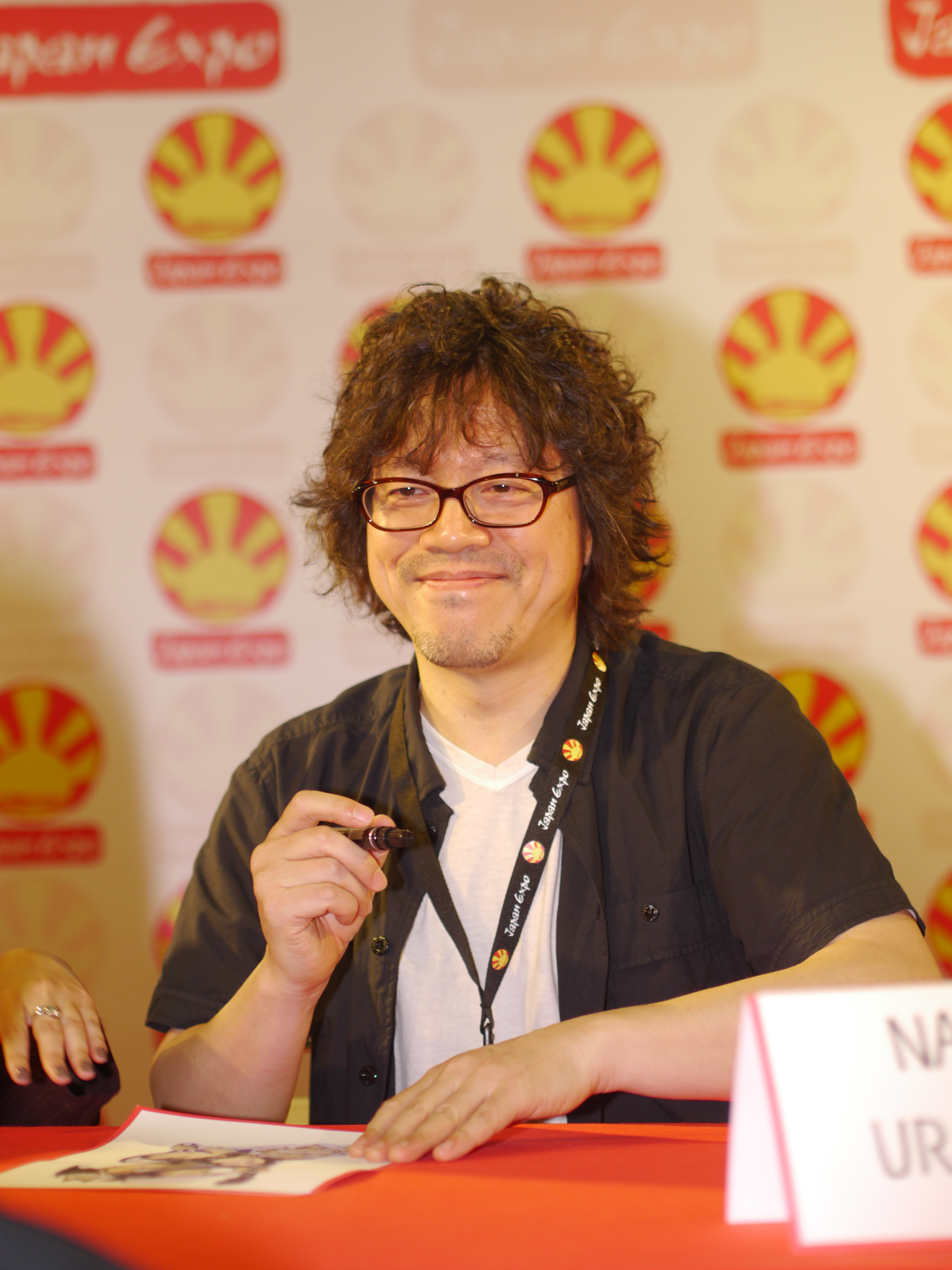
Although he pitched the initial idea for Pluto, Naoki Urasawa originally had no intention of creating it himself.

Urasawa, Nagasaki, and an editor from Shogakukan approached Tezuka Productions with the idea. Tezuka's son Macoto Tezka was informed of the idea in winter 2002. But with a new anime adaptation and other events already in the works, he did not want it to feel as if they were capitalizing on the special occasion. He felt there would be plenty of opportunity to have other artists do it at a later date and politely turned Urasawa down. However, Urasawa persisted and asked for a meeting where he would show rough sketches and explain what kind of story he wanted to create. Macoto met with Urasawa, Nagasaki and others on March 28, 2003. Macoto made Urasawa promise not to imitate his father but make the story in his own style, and even asked him to rethink the character designs.

While working on 20th Century Boys (1999–2006), Urasawa injured his shoulder and even considered retiring from drawing manga. Because he was unsure if his body would be able to handle it, Pluto was published once a month in the semimonthly Big Comic Original. Fusanosuke Natsume pointed out that in Pluto Urasawa included references not only to other Astro Boy arcs, but to other works by Tezuka as well, such as the characters Tawashi and Nakamura; the police car designed to look like a dog; Uran's encounter with animals; and an obsolete robot maid. He suspects the last is a reference to the "Future" volume of Phoenix.

Although people often call Pluto a dark take on a children's classic, Urasawa feels that the idea that Tezuka's work is lighthearted is a common misconception. He described "The Greatest Robot on Earth" arc as not being "about a righteous robot that took down bad robots, it was about the emptiness of war. When I read that when I was about 4, I felt like I had been told a very deep story, something meant for adults. I think everyone felt that way when they read it. It was never actually meant for kids." He additionally explained that through its anime and various adaptations it has been "reimagined as very wholesome and safe content, but if you really look at Tezuka's work on a deeper level, it's very dark. If you aim to properly adapt or remake any of Tezuka's work, you will naturally end up with a very dark story."

When asked in 2019 what advice he would give to an artist who wanted to adapt one of his own works like he did Astro Boy, Urasawa replied "Don't do it!" He explained that even though he understood the responsibility of the undertaking, the pressure and intense struggle was so much that he will never do it again and would advise a young artist to avoid it as well. Similarly, Nagasaki has also said he will not do it again.

== Media ==
=== Manga ===
Written and illustrated by Naoki Urasawa, while also working on 20th Century Boys, Pluto was serialized in Shogakukan's seinen manga magazine Big Comic Original from September 5, 2003, (Note: It started in the magazine's 18th issue of 2003 (cover date September 20), released on September 5.) to April 4, 2009. (Note: It finished in the magazine's eighth issue of 2009 (cover date April 20), released on April 4.) The 65 individual chapters were collected and published into eight tankōbon volumes, each of which had a deluxe edition that includes the color pages from the chapters' original magazine run released before the normal version; the first volume was published on September 30, 2004, and the last on June 19, 2009. Takashi Nagasaki, who would later go on to work with Urasawa on Billy Bat and Master Keaton Remaster, is credited as the series' co-author. Macoto Tezka, Osamu Tezuka's son, supervised the series and Tezuka Productions is listed as having given cooperation.

It was licensed and released in English in North America by Viz Media.

==== Volumes ====
| No. | Original release date | Original ISBN | English release date | English ISBN |
|---|---|---|---|---|
| 1 | September 30, 2004 | 978-4-09-187756-7 | February 17, 2009 | 978-1-42-151918-0 |
Act 1 : "Mont Blanc" (モンブラン); Act 2 : "Gesicht" (ゲジヒト); Act 3 : "Brau 1589" (ブラウ1589); Act 4 : "North No. 2 (Part 1)" (ノース2号前); Act 5 : "North No. 2 (Part 2)" (ノース2号中); Act 6 : "North No. 2 (Part 3)" (ノース2号後編); Act 7 : "Brando" (ブランド)
| 2 | April 22, 2005 | 978-4-09-187757-4 | March 17, 2009 | 978-1-42-151919-7 |
Act 8 : "Atom" (鉄腕アトム); Act 9 : "Professor Ochanomizu" (お茶の水博士); Act 10 : "Hercules" (ヘラクレス); Act 11 : "Patching In" (回線をつなげ); Act 12 : "Family Portrait" (家族の肖像); Act 13 : "False Memory" (記憶の手違い); Act 14 : "Dr. Roosevelt" (Dr.ルーズベルト); Act 15 : "Enemy Parts" (敵の部品)
| 3 | March 24, 2006 | 978-4-09-180309-2 | May 19, 2009 | 978-1-42-151920-3 |
Act 16 : "Uran" (ウラン); Act 17 : "Death to Machines!!" (機械に死を!!); Act 18 : "Zeronium" (ゼロニウム); Act 19 : "Epsilon" (エプシロン); Act 20 : "Robot Haters" (ロボット嫌い); Act 21 : "Uran's Search" (ウランの探し物); Act 22 : "Pluto" (プルートゥ); Act 23 : "Wandering Soul" (彷徨（さまよ）える魂)
| 4 | December 12, 2006 | 978-4-09-181028-1 | July 28, 2009 | 978-1-42-151921-0 |
Act 24 : "The Professor's Day Off" (博士の休日); Act 25 : "A Fine Day for a Tornado" (竜巻日和); Act 26 : "The Confrontation" (対決); Act 27 : "A Different Dream" (違った夢); Act 28 : "Emergency Call" (緊急コール); Act 29 : "Whispering Shadows" (つぶやく影); Act 30 : "Three Scientists at Kimberley" (キンバリーの三博士); Act 31 : "The Greatest Robot on Earth" (地上最大のロボット)
| 5 | November 20, 2007 | 978-4-09-181595-8 | September 15, 2009 | 978-1-42-152583-9 |
Act 32 : "The Scars of Memory" (記憶の傷跡); Act 33 : "Victors, Sages and Mortals" (勝者、賢者、生者); Act 34 : "God's Choice" (神の選択); Act 35 : "Gesicht, Do You Copy?" (応答せよゲジヒト); Act 36 : "Pursuit of Hate" (憎悪の追跡); Act 37 : "Sad Visitor" (悲しき訪問者); Act 38 : "The Chaos of Six Billion" (六〇億の混沌); Act 39 : "The Imprisoned King" (獄中の王)
| 6 | July 18, 2008 | 978-4-09-182185-0 | November 17, 2009 | 978-1-42-152721-5 |
Act 40 : "Sage of the Sands" (砂の賢者); Act 41 : "Sahad" (サハド); Act 42 : "A Home in Hades" (冥王の故郷（ふるさと）); Act 43 : "An Encounter with Death" (死への邂逅); Act 44 : "I Am Pluto" (私はプルートゥ); Act 45 : "Negotiation and Reparation" (代償と交渉); Act 46 : "End of the Dream" (夢の終わり); Act 47 : "Real Tears" (本物の涙)
| 7 | February 20, 2009 | 978-4-09-182460-8 | January 19, 2010 | 978-1-42-153267-7 |
Act 48 : "Six Billion Personalities" (60億の偏り); Act 49 : "Surprise Party" (サプライズパーティー); Act 50 : "To Eat the Earth" (地球を食べる); Act 51 : "Two Suns" (ふたつの太陽); Act 52 : "Wassily's Choice" (ワシリーの選択); Act 53 : "Showdown at Vigeland Castle" (ビーゲラン城の決斗); Act 54 : "Burgeoning Grief" (悲しみの覚醒); Act 55 : "The Great Awakening" (大いなる目覚め)
| 8 | June 19, 2009 | 978-4-09-182668-8 | April 6, 2010 | 978-1-42-153343-8 |
Act 56 : "Formula for Destruction" (破壊の数式); Act 57 : "Whither the Heart" (心の行方); Act 58 : "Old Friend" (オールドフレンド); Act 59 : "Various Reunions" (さまざまな再会); Act 60 : "The Honest Truth" (真実の真相); Act 61 : "Doomsday" (滅亡の時); Act 62 : "Gesicht's Legacy" (ゲジヒトの遺言); Act 63 : "Wish Upon a Star" (星に願いを); Act 64 : "The Sound of the End" (終わりの音); Act 65 : "The Greatest Robot in History" (史上最大のロボット)

=== Stage play ===
A play adaptation of Pluto that incorporated 3D imagery via projection mapping opened at Tokyo's Bunkamura Theatre Cocoon on January 9, 2015. Directed and choreographed by Sidi Larbi Cherkaoui, it starred Mirai Moriyama as Atom, Yasufumi Terawaki as Gesicht, Hiromi Nagasaku as both Uran and Helena, Akira Emoto as both Professor Tenma and Blau 1589, Kazutoyo Yoshimi as both Professor Ochanomizu and Dr. Roosevelt, and Yutaka Matsushige as Abullah. A new production of the play was performed in Tokyo, England, the Netherlands, Belgium and Osaka between January 6 and March 14, 2018. New cast members included Tao Tsuchiya as both Uran and Helena, Shunsuke Daitō as Gesicht, and Mitsuru Fukikoshi as Abullah. A performance of the play was broadcast on WOWOW Prime on June 23, 2018.

=== Original net animation ===
An eight-episode original net animation (ONA) adaptation by Studio M2 premiered exclusively on Netflix on October 26, 2023.

=== Film ===
Universal Pictures and Illumination acquired the rights to Pluto in 2010 for a live-action/CGI film. No news has emerged since.

== Reception ==
=== Manga ===
Pluto has sold over 10 million copies. It has won and been nominated for numerous awards. It was awarded the ninth Tezuka Osamu Cultural Prize and an Excellence Prize at the seventh Japan Media Arts Festival, both in 2005. Marking Urasawa's second and third time receiving those honors respectively. Also in 2005, Pluto topped the first Kono Manga ga Sugoi! list for male readers, which surveyed people in the manga and publishing industry. In 2010, the series was given the 41st Seiun Award for Best Comic and won Best Series at Italy's Lucca Comics Awards. In France, the manga won the 2010 Prix Asie-ACBD award at Japan Expo and the 2011 Intergenerational Award at the Angoulême International Comics Festival.

The American Young Adult Library Services Association named Pluto one of their Great Graphic Novels for Teens of 2009, likewise, the School Library Journal nominated the series as one of the Best Comics for Teens. At the 2010 Eisner Awards, Viz's English edition was nominated for Best Limited Series or Story Arc and Best U.S. Edition of International Material—Asia, additionally, Urasawa was nominated for the Best Writer/Artist award for both Pluto and 20th Century Boys. Viz's edition was also nominated for the Harvey Award in the Best American Edition of Foreign Material category.

Joseph Luster of Otaku USA called Pluto "flat-out incredible" and felt it should be required reading, "not just for fans of comics, but for fans of solid, absorbing stories." He said that, as a reimagining of another work, it "goes above and beyond the call of duty, and there aren't many other series out there that can get me clamoring for the next set of chapters like this one does." In her review, Deb Aoki of About.com claimed Pluto "will suck you in with its masterful storytelling, and will break your heart with its uncommon emotional depth." and gave the first volume a five out of five rating. She also stated that the series conjures up "thought-provoking questions about robots and what it means to be human." Manga critic Jason Thompson pointed out the series' obvious allusions to the real-life Iraq War; the United States of Thracia (United States of America) invaded Persia (Iraq) after falsely claiming they had robots of mass destruction (weapons of mass destruction). Reviewing volume seven, Anime News Network's Carlo Santos felt the story got a lot more enjoyable with all the loose ends tied up and said Urasawa does a fine job of integrating Tezuka's design with his own style. However, he wrote that "Urasawa continues to add pointless little flourishes to the story: references to Pinocchio, a creepy little children's song, a symbolic crack in a wall. It probably all has some kind of thematic unity in his head". Santos strongly praised the final volume, saying it works on every level; with philosophical points of war and humanity and artificial intelligence, and feelings of love, hate, hope, and despair that tug at the heart.

=== Stage play adaptation ===
The Guardian theater critic Michael Billington called the set and visuals of the stage adaptation of Pluto "spectacular" and gave the 2018 London performance 3 out of 5 stars. He finished by writing "The show may appeal to manga devotees and is clearly on the side of good in its plea for a world free from hate. But, for all its technical skill, it never engages us emotionally and never explains how we create a world in which humans and robots usefully coexist. This is comic-book theatre executed with great panache but to little real purpose."
