= Astro Boy (character) =

Fictional character in Japanese manga

- Astro Boy character
- First appearance: Captain Atom (Shonen, April 1, 1951)
- Created by: Osamu Tezuka
- Voiced by (Japanese): Mari Shimizu (1963 and 1980 TV series); Makoto Tsumura (2003 TV series); Aya Ueto (2009 film); Yoko Hikasa (Pluto)
- Voiced by (English): Billie Lou Watt (1963 TV series); Patricia Kugler Whitely (1980 TV series); Steven Bednarski (1980 TV series; Canadian dub); Candi Milo (2003 TV series); Freddie Highmore (2009 film); Laura Stahl (Pluto)
- Portrayed by: Masato Segawa (1959 live-action series)

In-universe information
- Aliases: Atom; Tobio Tenma (real name)
- Nickname: Astro
- Species: Robot
- Gender: Male
- Relatives: Doctor Tenma (creator/father), Professor Ochanomizu (foster father), Shunsaku Ban (caregiver), Ethanol (robot father), Rin (robot mother), Atlas (brother), Uran (sister), Cobalt (brother), Chi-tan (brother)
- Nationality: Japanese

Astro Boy, known in Japan as Atom (Japanese: アトム, Hepburn: Atomu), is a fictional superhero, cartoon character, and main protagonist of the eponymous manga series and franchise. Created by Osamu Tezuka, the character was introduced in the 1951 Captain Atom manga and then in his own manga series. He since has appeared in animated television shows, an animated feature film adaptation, a live-action television series, other works by Tezuka, and video games.

On 7 April 2003, the City of Niiza registered the character as an actual resident. He was also inducted into the Robot Hall of Fame in 2004.

== Creation and conception ==
Atom (known as Astro Boy or just Astro in English) originally appeared as a supporting character in the comic Atom Taishi (Ambassador Atom, sometimes referred to as Captain Atom), which appeared in Shonen, a monthly magazine for boys, in April 1951. Tezuka then created a comic series in which Astro was the main character.

Osamu Tezuka created Astro to be, in the words of Frederik L. Schodt (creator of the English-language version of the Astro Boy manga), a "21st-century reverse-Pinocchio, a nearly perfect robot who strove to become more human and emotive and to serve as an interface between man and machine." As Tezuka's art style advanced, Astro "became more modern and 'cute'" to appeal to the audience of boys in elementary school.

== Appearances ==
=== Original manga and 1960s series ===
Astro Boy was created by Doctor Tenma (Dr. Boynton in the 1960s English dub), and was meant to be a replacement for his recently deceased son Tobio (named Toby in various English translations and Astor Boynton in the 1960s English dub). However, because the robotic replica was not able to grow and age like a normal human child, Tenma sold him to a circus led by the cruel Ham Egg. At the circus, Tobio was renamed to "Astro" and later found by Professor Ochanomizu (Dr. Elefun) and taken away following the law of robot rights. Ochanomizu gave Astro a family with a robotic mother, father, sister (Uran/Astro Girl) and brother (Cobalt/Jetto). As head of the Ministry of Science, Ochanomizu often calls on Astro to help resolve situations involving humans, robots and (on occasion) extraterrestrials.

=== 1980s series ===
In the 1980s animated series, Tenma's coworkers are afraid of the danger that his robot creation may bring. While the robot is almost finished, Skunk steals copies of its plans and give them to his boss Walpur Guiss, who plans to build an evil robot to "rule the world".

Doctor Tenma raises the robot Tobio as if he were his son. While alone, Tobio learns to fly, but accidentally touches electric wires. Shortly afterward, Tobio malfunctions and his eyes flash red. Tobio had malfunctioned due to the activation of Atlas, Walpur Guiss's robot. Tenma, not knowing this, believes Tobio to have short-circuited.

Honda attempts to destroy Atlas with a Robot Disposer, but it goes out of control due to Dr. Tenma's interference and attacks the city. The disposer is destroyed by Tobio, who dumps it into the sea. Soon afterward, knowledge of Tobio's existence becomes widespread; Tenma, fearing that the secret is out, decides that he and his creation shall go to America.

While traveling to the United States, Tobio causes minor destruction due to failing to control his powers. Tenma expels him, refusing to acknowledge him as his son. While outside, Tobio is approached by Hamegg, a ringmaster who recruits him to work backstage in his circus. Tobio is manipulated into signing a contract that gives Hamegg ownership of him.

Skunk, meanwhile, brings Atlas with him for his next plot, which is to cause icebergs to sink a ship and have Atlas recover the gold transported by the ship. Tobio foils the plan by attacking the icebergs. He meets Atlas and they both realize that they feel they had met in the past without knowing how, then fight. Tobio is drained of energy and falls unconscious at Atlas' feet. Atlas considers destroying Tobio, but relents. Hamegg soon finds Tobio and locks him in his trunk.

Tobio wakes up at the circus surrounded by Hamegg; Kathy, his employee; and Tornado, the robot star of the circus. Tobio is given daily chores and performs a clown act in the show. Misunderstanding the instructions he is given and not yet in control of his powers, he makes many mistakes, drawing Hamegg's fury. Tobio is later found by Ochanomizu, who recognizes him as Dr. Tenma's missing robot. Kathy fakes Tobio's death, which fools Hamegg and convinces him to rip up the contract. Kathy brings Tobio to Ochanomizu, who is going to return him to Japan. Ochanomizu explains that Tobio is an atomic robot, and Kathy gives him the name Atom.

=== 2003 series ===
Astro Boy re-appears as the protagonist in the 2003 series; a robot with the ability to think and reason. During Astro's creation, Tenma lost the trust of his fellow scientists, who believed that he had gone insane after being overcome with grief for his dead son. Tenma, who was indeed displaying signs of insanity at that point, finished his project and named the robot after his son. Astro is led into a basement full of broken robots and asks for Tenma to fix them. After Tenma refuses, Tobio rebels against him and as a result, Tenma shuts him down.

Before long, Tenma well and truly went insane, burning down the lab of the Ministry of Science and resigning his position as minister. Tobio was found by Tenma's successor Ochanomizu, who resurrected him and renamed him Atom. Ochanomizu allows Astro to attend school and builds him a robotic sister, Uran. When necessary, Astro fights evil robots, humans, and on occasion aliens.

=== Feature film ===
The film is set in the futuristic Metro City, a metropolis which floats in the sky above the polluted "Surface". Metro City's population is aided by a multitude of different robots who are dumped on the Surface when they are broken or disused. Toby, son of Dr. Tenma, learns that his father is going to show President Stone, the militaristic leader of the city, the Peacekeeper, a new guardian robot that he has been working on. Doctor Elefun, one of Tenma's colleagues, introduces Stone to the Blue and Red Cores, two energy spheres mined from a star fragment, that produce energy which can power robots via positive and negative energy, respectively. Meanwhile, Toby has been released early from school and attends the demonstration of the Peacekeeper. Stone places the Red Core in the Peacekeeper, causing it to go out of control and kill Toby. Dr. Tenma builds a clone of Toby, who is powered by the Blue Core and possesses Toby's memories.

Tenma quickly realizes that while the robot possesses Toby's memories, he is not exactly like his original son. Unaware that he is a robot, Toby tries to figure out why he can understand the language of some robot cleaners and discovers he can fly via rocket-boosters hidden in his feet. He discovers various other abilities and heads home to tell his father, only to find that Tenma and Elefun are discussing deactivating him. Tenma reveals to Toby that he is a robot. President Stone's men detect the Blue Core's energy signature and pursue Toby. Rendered unconscious, Toby falls off the floating city and lands in the junkyard below. He meets several children including Cora, a girl who left Metro City after her parents neglected her, and a robotic dog named Trashcan. Toby meets the Robot Revolution Front: Sparx, Robotsky, and Mike, who easily identify Toby as a robot and rename him "Astro". Astro goes along with his new name and lives with the children and their fatherly figure, Hamegg. Hamegg appears to care for broken robots, but secretly treats robots just as callously as Stone, and also runs the Robot Games: destructive gladiatorial matches in which robots are forced to fight to the death.

Astro and his friends find an offline construction robot named Zog. Astro secretly revives Zog, and the kids bring him back and clean him up for the Hamegg games. Later that night, Astro comes across Cora trying to call Metro City. She reveals to him that she actually has parents and was worried if they even missed her. The next day at the Hamegg games, Hamegg betrays Astro, learning of him being a robot, and pits Astro against other robots in the Robot Games. Unable to leave, Astro is forced to destroy all the robots. Hamegg releases Zog for Astro to fight, but both refuse to fight one another. Stone and his men arrive then and arrest Astro. They take him back to the Ministry of Science, where Tenma is asked to remove the Blue Core; however, at the last moment, he has a change of heart, accepting that even if Astro is not Toby, he is still his son, and allows Astro to escape. Stone places the Red Core into the Peacekeeper again, only for it to absorb him and his consciousness. Astro and Stone fight across the city, demolishing most of the buildings and causing the city to begin crashing to Earth. Astro attempts to slow Metro City's descent by flying underneath and pushing upwards with his leg-rockets. Stone catches Astro and is about to absorb him, but when the Blue and Red Cores clash, he lets Astro out due to the close proximity of the two Cores causing him great pain.

Astro lands in a building, where he reunites with Tenma. Tenma informs him that if the Blue Core and Red Core come together, Astro and the Peacekeeper will both die. Astro decides that this was the reason he was made, and flies straight toward Stone, crashing into him. The Interaction between the Cores destroys the Peacekeeper, frees Stone, and drains both Cores of energy, deactivating Astro. However, Zog transfers some of his Blue Core energy to Astro, reviving him. Astro is reunited with Dr. Tenma, and Cora finds and makes up with her parents.

== Other appearances ==
As part of the Osamu Tezuka's Star System, Astro has appeared in several of the artist's works (although he is not always identified as "Astro Boy").

=== List of Astro Boy's appearances ===
- "Astro Boy" in Captain Atom – 1951
- "Astro Boy" in Astro Boy – 1952
- "Conference Participant" in The Adventure of Rock – 1952
- "Sergeant Ichinotani" in X-Point on the South Pacific – 1953
- "Ryoichi" in The Destroyer of the Earth – 1954
- "Captain Larry" in My Memory – 1959
- "Astro Boy" in Shikuoyamaengi Picture Scroll – 1962
- "The Mask" in Robot Labor Union Leader – 1964
- "Astro Boy" in Gachaboi's Record of One Generation – 1970
- "Astro Boy" in Lion Books: A Hundred Tales – Chapter of Gold – 1971
- "The Mask" in Bakaichi – 1971
- "The Mask" in Japanese People in 1972 – 1972
- "Flying Man Competition Spectator" in Black Jack: Man Bird – 1973
- "Isao" in Black Jack: Son of Shiva – 1974
- "Black Jack's Client" in Black Jack: You did it! – 1975
- "Person in Framed Painting" in Black Jack: Teruteru Bozu – 1976
- "Astro Boy" in The Three-eyed One: The Magician – 1976
- "Passerby" in Black Jack: Black Jack Saves his Savior – 1978
- "Astro Boy" in Osamu Tezuka on American Comics – 1979
- "Person in Painting" in Unico: Shogaku-Ichinensei Version – 1980
- "Face of Jinnai" in Princess Lumpenela – 1980
- "Jimmy" in Rainbow Parakeet: House of Doll – 1981
- "The Mask" in Rainbow Parakeet: Forest of Fossil – 1981
- "Black Jack" in How the World of Anime will look in the 21st Century – 1982
- "Astro Boy" in A word from the parent who bore you – 1982
- "Jimmy" in Golden Bat – 1982
- "Astro Boy" in Rabbit House 2001 – 1982
- "Person in Painting" in This is what's going to happen in 1983 – 1983
- "Astro Boy" in Dream cars & cars of the future – 1984
- "Astro Boy" in Atom Cat – 1986
- "The Mask" in Fuku-chan in 21st Century – 1986
- "Adam" in Undersea Super Train: Marine Express – 1979 anime
- He also make several cameos in Black Jack TV series
- Astro has also made a cameo in two episodes of Kimba the White Lion
- "Monica Teen" Chapter 43 and 44 (Green Treasure arc)
- "Atom" in Pluto, a remake of the story arc, "The Greatest Robot on Earth" (地上最大のロボット, Chijō Saidai no Robotto) by Naoki Urasawa – 2003

== Reception ==
Astro was listed on Empire's 50 Greatest Comic Characters list ranking forty third, making Astro the only manga character on the list. IGN's Chris Mackenzie also ranked Astro Boy as 2 on the list of the top anime characters of all time. Astro was placed tenth Mania Entertainment's 10 Most Iconic Anime Heroes written by Thomas Zoth who commented that "he was Japan's first great modern cartoon hero, on the printed page and the TV screen". In 2014, IGN ranked him as the twenty-fifth greatest anime character of all time.

Katsuhiro Otomo chose ATOM as the name of the main computer in his manga Fireball as an homage to Tezuka and the character.

== See also ==
- List of Osamu Tezuka anime
- List of Osamu Tezuka manga
- Osamu Tezuka's Star System
