= List of Astro Boy chapters =

This is a list of chapters of Astro Boy, also known as Mighty Atom (Japanese: Tetsuwan Atomu (鉄腕アトム)), a classic Japanese manga series first created by Osamu Tezuka in 1951. The first English translation of the Astro Boy series was published in the United States by Dark Horse Comics in 2002. It was based on the most definitive collection of the series published by Akita Shoten in Japan.

== Overview ==
The Mighty Atom manga (more commonly known as Astro Boy in the West), was first created from 1951 to 1968 on Shōnen Magazine (chapters 001/075). From January 1967 to January 1969, it was published in the Sankei newspaper (chapters 076/93). After its run in Sankei, Astro Boy appeared in various magazines as one-shot chapters (chapters 094/100). The last chapters were serialized in Second Grader magazine, starting in September 1980 and concluding in December 1981 (chapters 101/115).

The first chapter drawn was "Ambassador Atom" and the last chapter "Showdown on Mt. Fuji". The total number of chapters is 115. The anime also featured some unique chapters separate from the manga.

Between 2002 and 2004, Dark Horse Comics released a comprehensive 23-volume set entitled Osamu Tezuka's Original Astro Boy, based on the 1999 Japanese language Akita Shoten collection. This presented the stories in Tezuka's preferred order rather than in strict chronological order.

== Volumes ==
No.	Original release date	Original ISBN	English release date	English ISBN
1	June 4, 1999	4-253-06479-5	March 27, 2002	978-1-56971-676-2
"The Birth of Astro Boy"; 043. "The Hot Dog Corps"; 042. "Plant People"
2	June 4, 1999	4-253-06480-9	April 24, 2002	978-1-56971-677-9
040. "His Highness Deadcross"; 045. "The Three Magicians"; 049. "White Planet"
3	June 4, 1999	4-253-06481-7	May 29, 2002	978-1-56971-678-6
054. "The Greatest Robot in The World"; 027. "Mad Machine"
4	July 8, 1999	4-253-06482-5	June 26, 2002	978-1-56971-679-3
047. "Robot Land"; 030. "Ivan the Fool"; 039. "A Day to Remember"; 021. "Ghost Manufacturing Machine"
5	July 8, 1999	4-253-06483-3	July 31, 2002	978-1-56971-680-9
025. "Crucifix Island"; 036. "Space Snow Leopard"; 035. "The Artificial Sun"
6	August 5, 1999	4-253-06484-1	September 04, 2002	978-1-56971-681-6
"Once Upon a Time Astro Boy Tales" part 1: 076. "Beginning of the Contradiction"; 077. "Living Earth, 101"; 078. "The Birth of Neva #2"; 079. "Baro, the Robot"; 080. "Scara Disappears"; 081. "The Energy Tube"; 082. "The Angel of Vietnam"
7	August 5, 1999	4-253-06485-X	September 25, 2002	978-1-56971-790-5
"Once Upon a Time Astro Boys Tales" part 2: 083. "The Summer of 1993"; 085. "Robot ChiruChiru in Danger!!!"; 086. "Astro's Energy Runs Out"; 087. "Dr. Tenma"; 088. "The Tragedy of Bailey"; 089. "Astro Goes to the Circus"
8	September 9, 1999	4-253-06486-8	October 30, 2002	978-1-56971-791-2
"Once Upon a Time Astro Boy Tales" part 3: 090. "Living Mold from Outer Space"; 091. "A Declaration of Robot Rights"; 092. "Astro goes to Elementary School"; 093. "Gone with the Snow"; 072. "The Faceless Robot"
9	September 9, 1999	4-253-06487-6	November 27, 2002	978-1-56971-792-9
031. "The Secret of the Egyptian Conspirators"; 037. "The Invisible Giant"; 008. "Cobalt"
10	October 7, 1999	4-253-06488-4	December 26, 2002	978-1-56971-793-6
048. "Atom vs. Garon"; 015. "Yellow Horse"; 073. "The 100 Million Year Old Crime"; 064. "Astro's Been Stolen!"
11	October 7, 1999	4-253-06489-2	January 22, 2003	978-1-56971-812-4
053. "The Last Day on Earth"; 034. "Subterranean Tank"; 075. "The Man Who Returned From Mars"; 044. "The Blast Furnace Mystery"
12	November 4, 1999	4-253-06490-6	February 26, 2003	978-1-56971-813-1
062. "Roboids"; 029. "The Eyes of Christ"; 013. "Youth Gas"; 066. "Broadcasts from Outer Space"
13	November 4, 1999	4-253-06491-4	March 26, 2003	978-1-56971-894-0
074. "Zolomon's Jewels"; 016. "Shootout in the Alps"; 057. "The Lying Robot"; "Astro Boy's Origin and History, Part 1"
14	December 2, 1999	4-253-06492-2	April 30, 2003	978-1-56971-895-7
041. "The White-Hot Being"; 038. "Uran"; 050. "Demon Bees"; 026. "Fortress of the Centaurs"; 012. "Gernica"; "Astro Boy's Origin and History, Part 2"
15	December 2, 1999	4-253-06493-0	May 28, 2003	978-1-56971-896-4
011. "Electro"; 022. "Black Lux"; 001. "Ambassador Atom"; 002. "Gas People"
16	January 13, 2000	4-253-06494-9	June 25, 2003	978-1-56971-897-1
004. "Red Cat"; 018. "The Midoro Swamp"; 063. "Robio and Robiette"; 052. "The Devil's Balloons!"
17	January 13, 2000	4-253-06495-7	May 21, 2003	978-1-56971-898-8
014. "The Frozen Human"; 032. "Gademu"; 010. "Fuhrer ZZZ"; 067. "The Face in the Rock"; 046. "Space Parasites"
18	February 3, 2000	4-253-06496-5	August 27, 2003	978-1-56971-899-5
051. "The Robot Spaceship"; 028. "Count Bat"; 017. "Atlas"; 033. "S.O.S. from the Satellite"; 023. "The Mysterious Ball"
19	February 3, 2000	4-253-06497-3	October 01, 2003	978-1-56971-900-8
065. "Blue Knight"; 068. "Astro Boy Reborn"
20	March 2, 2000	4-253-06498-1	November 12, 2003	978-1-56971-901-5
070. "The Melanin Tribe"; 071. "Meeva"; "Astro Boy's Origins and History, Part 3"
21	March 2, 2000	4-253-06499-X	November 26, 2003	978-1-56971-902-2
020. "Robot Bombs"; 006. "Flying Skyscraper"; 007. "Mission to Mars"; 005. "Sea Serpent Island"; 003. "Frankenstein"; 009. "The Coral Reef Adventure"; 019. "The Test Pilot"; 024. "Super Cyclone"
22	April 6, 2000	4-253-06500-7	December 31, 2003	978-1-56971-903-9
097. "Astro Returns"; 084. "The Bomb Train"; 099. "Showdown in the Standard Deviation Kingdom"; 094. "Astro's First Love"; 061. "Slipper Catfish in Imminent Danger"; 098. "Astro II"; 056. "I Am Knowall" (A special parody); 096. "You're Guilty!" (A Black Jack episode featuring a cameo by Astro Boy); 055. "Bad-Guy Robots"; 059. "The Time Machine"; 058. "The Brain Swap"; 095. "The End of Astro Boy"
23	April 6, 2000	4-253-06501-5	January 28, 2004	978-1-59307-135-6
101. "The Robot Disposer"; 102. "Franken"; 103. "Astro vs. Atlas"; 104. "Pula, the Baby Elephant"; 105. "Guinness Book Robots"; 106. "The Berserker Robot"; 107. "The Magnet Robot"; 108. "Giant Uran"; 109. "Space Doll"; 110. "Ghosts in the Desert"; 111. "The Space Bug"; 112. "Crazy Duck"; 113. "The Feline Guardian Deity"; 114. "The Space Shuttle"; 115. "Showdown on Mt. Fuji"; 100. "The Silver Tower"

== Lost episodes ==
- 069. "Chi-Tan"
- 060. "Earth Defense Force"
