= List of Astro Boy characters =

This is a list of characters from the manga and anime series Astro Boy created by Osamu Tezuka, including the 1963, 1980, and 2003 adaptations.

== Major characters ==
=== Astro Boy ===
Mighty Atom / Astro Boy (dub) (アトム, Atomu)

The robot boy fashioned after the deceased son of Dr. Tenma, the head of the Ministry of Science in the year 2000. Aside from possessing the strength of 100,000 horsepower (later 1,000,000, though these numbers often fluctuate between stories) and the kind personality of a child, he has what are called his "seven amazing powers": jet-powered flight, multilingualism, analytical skills, headlight eyes, super-sensitive hearing, hidden weapons in his back, and the ability to tell if a person is good or evil. In addition, he has a built-in Geiger counter and shortwave communication system.

=== Dr. Ochanomizu ===
Dr. Hiroshi Ochanomizu / Dr. Packidermus J. Elefun (1963, 1980 dub) / Dr. O'Shay (2003 dub) (お茶の水博志博士, Ochanomizu Hiroshi-hakase)

The present head of the Ministry of Science and a fearless campaigner for robotic rights, who believes that humans and robots can co-exist peacefully, unlike most other human characters in the series (particularly Tenma). He is the adoptive father figure and mentor of Astro Boy, whom he recognizes as unique from other robots, following his abandonment by Tenma and is physically characterized by portly stature and cartoonishly large nose, with his English name being an allusion to the latter.

Ochanomizu is responsible for the creation of Astro's sister Uran and his brother and predecessor Cobalt (who only appears in the first animated series). Somewhat eccentric by nature, he tends to be excitable when faced by a scientific mystery, particularly when his opinions are questioned by his scientific colleagues.

The name "Ochanomizu" translates to "Tea Water", and is also a neighborhood in Tokyo. In Atom: The Beginning, Hiroshi Ochanomizu has a sister called Ran, while in the manga Pluto he is shown to be a widower with a granddaughter. The character was voiced by Bill Nighy in the English-language film.

=== Dr. Tenma ===
Dr. Umatarō Tenma / Dr. Astor Boynton II (dub) / Dr. Taro Tenma (2003 dub) (天馬午太郎博士, Tenma Umatarō-hakase)

The former head of the Ministry of Science, who lost his only son, Tobio Tenma, to a traffic accident. Overcome with grief, he vowed to recreate his son as a robot: Astro Boy. Once he activated Astro, he was seemingly mentally better, but grew frustrated with the fact that, as a robot, Astro did not grow physically. As a result, he sold Astro off to a circus and disappeared.

In the original manga, Tenma later regrets his rejection of his creation in light of Astro's heroic feats, but knows he can never truly make amends for them, only occasionally reappearing to assist him, such as by constructing robotic parents for him and aiding him in his conflicts with Pluto and the Blue Knight. In the first animated series, Tenma is not heard from again after the first episode until Episode 97, where it is suggested that he has either been institutionalized or committed suicide, while in the 1980s version, he does not outright reject Astro, who is instead kidnapped by the circus owner Hamegg.

In the 2003 series, Tenma takes the role of the main antagonist, with his abandonment of Astro being triggered by the latter rebelling against him in light of his cold and destructive treatment of other robots. Upon seeing Astro's heroic acts, Tenma comes to see his creation as a twistedly messianic figure whom he ultimately concludes will lead the robotic population to overthrow humanity. In order to spearhead Astro's development to this end, he constructs a mysterious new robot named Shadow, whose true appearance is eventually revealed to be identical to Tenma himself. The series ends with Tenma being rejected by Astro Boy yet again even after resetting his memory, attempting suicide as a result, but being saved by Astro before being imprisoned for his crimes.

In the 2009 film, the character is given the first name "Bill" and is voiced by Nicolas Cage. It is the only version where Tenma both comes to accept Astro Boy as a true son and successfully makes amends with him.

=== Uran ===
Uran / Astro Girl (1963 dub) / Zoran (2003 dub) (ウラン)

Astro's robot sister with a shown adoration towards Astro; she is a superhuman robot with a naive, tomboyish personality. Constructed by Dr. Ochanomizu as a "gift" for Astro, Uran is an extremely mischievous little girl who constantly lands her older brother in trouble. While lacking Astro's weaponry and propulsion systems, she is extremely powerful (50,000 horsepower) and regularly accompanies him on various missions (or attempts to). Like Astro, she is fully capable of experiencing human emotions - though being somewhat less 'mature'. In the 2003 anime Uran has the ability to communicate with animals. Her name is based on uranium, a metal used to power nuclear reactors.

=== Cobalt ===
Cobalt / Jetto (dub) (コバルト, Kobaruto)

Astro's robotic brother. His origins differ in the continuities of the manga and anime versions. In the manga, he is an inferior copy of Astro created as a replacement by Dr. Ochanomizu when he was missing and presumed scrap. In the anime version, he was a defective prototype of Astro built by Dr. Tenma, then sealed within the Ministry of Science archives and later released. Cobalt has abilities comparable to his brother's, but lacks Astro's intelligence and common sense. Clumsy, accident prone and gullible, he is a constant source of trouble for Astro's family (and everyone else who crosses his path). Despite these problems, Cobalt is often shown to be extremely kindhearted and loyal. In addition to the abilities that were copied from Astro, he also shares a kind of telepathic link with his brother that gives him the ability to sense when Astro is in danger and home in his location. His name is based on Cobalt-60, an isotope used in nuclear reactors. Physically, he resembles Astro, but is taller and thinner.

=== Chiitan ===
Chiitan (チータン)

Astro Boy's baby brother created by Dr. Ochanomizu and seen primarily in the last season of the anime. Created primarily as a comic relief character. Main characteristic is his loud bawling, which can shatter things. Chiitan's name is a pun on Titanium, as in Japan, it is cute to replace "t" sounds with "ch" sounds, thus making Chiitan's name pronounced similarly to "Titan" in Japanese.

=== Mama & Papa ===
Phosphorus & Ethanol / Mama & Papa (リン & エタノール / ママとパパ, Rin & Etanōru / Mama to papa)

Astro's robotic parents. Phosphorus is depicted as an idealized 1960s housewife, and she is sweet, kind and nurturing. She is entirely trusting of her son's impeccable nature, knows he would never deliberately lie or harm another being. In contrast, Ethanol is portrayed as something of a well-meaning blowhard, often jumping to conclusions and losing his temper over minor incidents. In some versions Phosphorus is modified to resemble Dr. Tenma's wife who had died of a heart condition shortly after Astro was sold to the circus. Their names are based on chemicals of the same name.

=== Shibugaki ===
Shibugaki / Dinny (1963 dub) / Alvin (1980 dub) / Abercrombie (2003 dub) (四部垣)

Astro Boy's friend, a loudmouthed bully.

=== Tamao Ōme ===
Tamao Ōme / Specs (1963 dub) / Theodore (1980 dub) / Alejo (2003 dub) (大目玉男, Ōme Tamao)

Astro Boy's friend, a robotics enthusiast who immediately welcomes Astro into his class and as his friend.

=== Higeoyaji ===
Shunsaku "Higeoyaji" Ban / Mr. Edgar Percival Pompous (1963 dub) / Daddy Walrus (1980 dub) / Wally Kisaragi (2003 dub) (ヒゲオヤジ / 伴俊作, Higeoyaji / Ban Shunsaku)

Originally introduced as a private investigator, Higeoyaji played several roles in the Japanese strip series, including school teacher and martial arts expert. Like Dr. Ochanomizu, Higeoyaji serves as a surrogate father for Astro and Uran, providing guidance and advice when necessary. While gruff and comically short-tempered, he harbors a deep admiration for Astro, seeing him as the son he never had, and even stands up to the formidable Inspector Tawashi in the boy's defense. In both the original comic strip and the 1980s Japanese series, he was Astro's school teacher (in Naoki Urasawa's Pluto he has apparently been promoted to principal), and his nickname was Mr. Mustachio or Daddy Walrus. In the 2003 remake, he is notably absent from Astro's school, working full-time as a private eye and is also the uncle of Dr. Ochanomizu's assistant, Yuko Kisaragi.

=== Inspector Tawashi ===
Inspector Tawashi / Inspector Gumshoe (dub) (田鷲警部, Tawashi keibu)

A highly placed police detective with an innate distrust of androids and robots (the reason to this is never explained in detail). Due to his opposition to Tokyo's robotic population, Inspector Tawashi has a long-standing feud with both Dr. Ochanomizu and Higeoyaji and frequently engages in volatile arguments with them. While arrogant, cantankerous and, in some cases, downright rude, he eventually comes to respect Astro's courage and abilities, even calling for his assistance in particularly difficult cases. Often partnered with Chief Nakamura.

=== Inspector Nakamura ===
Chief Nakamura / Chief McLaw (dub) (中村警部, Nakamura keibu)

The chief of the police and the partner of Inspector Tawashi. Played mainly for comic relief, Nakamura was normally portrayed as fat, dim-witted and gullible; a stereotype "clueless flatfoot" of the period. Nonetheless, he instantly recognized Astro's good side and frequently stood up for Astro against his bullying partner. In the 1963 English dub, he has an Irish accent.

=== Tobio Tenma ===
Tobio Tenma / Astor Boynton III (1963 dub) / Toby Boynton (1980 dub) (天馬飛雄, Tenma Tobio)

Dr. Tenma's son who died in a car accident. His death motivates the creation of Astro.

=== Pluto ===
Pluto

Pluto (プルートウ, Purūtō) is the central antagonist of the iconic The Greatest Robot in the World (地上最大のロボット, Chijō Saidai no Robotto) story arc. His creation was commissioned by corrupt sultan Chochi Chochi Ababa III to become the "strongest robot in the world" by killing all his competition in this field. These victims include Montblanc, North #2, Brando, Gesicht, Hercules and Epsilon, all of whom he destroys with ease while demonstrating himself as an emotionless killing machine, blindly loyal to his master and caring for nothing besides fighting. When fighting Astro Boy, his final target, Pluto begins to question his actions after being saved by his enemy. He also develops a soft spot for Astro Boy's sister Uran. During their final battle at a volcano, Pluto's creator reveals an even stronger robot named Bora, and Pluto sacrifices himself to destroy this enemy, save Astro and contain the volcanic eruption.

In the 2003 TV series, Pluto was created by Shadow, Dr. Tenma's robot double, and sacrifices himself to defeat a copy of himself named Acheron, who is the series' equivalent of Bora.

The story of Pluto is revised again in an eponymous 2003 manga by Naoki Urasawa, adapted to animation in 2023. This version of the character was originally Sahad, a peaceful Persian robot who was reprogrammed into an instrument of destruction. His creator, Dr. Abullah, became consumed with hatred due to losing his family in a devastating Middle-Eastern war, where robots fought other robots, being unable to kill humans. Abullah instigated a plot to destroy the world via an artificial intelligence based on himself before dying in the bombings. This plan includes the use of Bora, who in this version is a colossal robot embedded within the Earth and set to destroy it by tunneling into its core. Astro confronts Pluto after being implanted with what remains of Gesicht, who is initially the main protagonist of Pluto. Like in the original story, Pluto has a change of heart and sacrifices himself to destroy Bora after being spared by his opponent.

== Recurring characters ==
- Kenichi Shikishima / Kenneth (1980 dub) / Kennedy (2003 dub) (敷島健一, Shikishima Kenichi) - Atom's classmate, a very positive and outgoing young student who is very devoted to his friends. He is the class president and also the smartest.
- Dr. Fooler/Minimini / Dr. I.Q. Plenty (1963 dub) / Dr. Huntley (1980 dub) / Dr. Minimini (2003 dub) (フーラー博士 / ミニミニ博士, Fūrā-hakase / Minimini-hakase) - A recurring antagonist. He is an egotistical mad scientist, but his villainous schemes are usually comical. He once invented a wacky machine, causing all machines to go out of control.
- Acetylene Lamp / Mr. Drake (dub) (アセチレンランプ, Asechiren Ranpu) - A recurring antagonist, a tough imposing man usually associated with big business or the law.
- The Blue Knight - A blue suited robot who is hailed as a hero among many robots for helping those who were treated poorly by humans. He wields a sword whose aura weakens robots that refuse to rebel against humans, but does not affect rebellious robots like himself. He tends to be cold and cruel towards humans, especially those who mistreat robots, making him feared among humans. He does not care if he hurts anyone whether they are innocent or not. This is due to his past. The Blue Knight was originally created as the Blue Bon and had a younger sister named Maria. She became the bride of a human named Count Burg who abused and eventually destroyed her. Blue Bon went insane with grief and left to pursue his dream of building a nation where robots can be free.
- Hoshie Tenma (天馬星江, Tenma Hoshie) - Deceased wife of Dr. Tenma and mother of Tobio Tenma. Hoshie was the model for Astro Boy's robot mother.
- Hamegg / Cacciatore (1963, 1980 dub) / Brunard (2003 dub) (ハムエッグ, Hamu Eggu) - An antagonistic circus ringmaster who buys Astro from Dr. Tenma. He is cruel towards Astro and other robots. Dr. Ochanomizu meets him in the hospital, taking Astro away, much to Hamegg's dismay.
- Franken / Colosso (dub) (フランケン, Furanken) - A robot who resembles Frankenstein's monster. He used to be a dangerous robot, until Astro Boy turned him into a good guy.
- Sphinx (スフィンクス, Sufinkusu) - A half-lion, half-human robot. Although Astro Boy thought that the Sphinx was attacking him, she was only trying to protect Dr. Snow from thieves.
- Pook / Bobo (dub) - A robot who can transform into any shape. He was invented by Dr. I. M. Sinister. Damaged in a fight with Astro Boy, his transformation mechanism malfunctioned leaving him in a part-lion, part-duck, part-bear, part-eagle, part-frog, formed robot.
- Skunk Kusai / Fearless Fred Fink (dub) (スカンク草井, Sukanku Kusai) - A criminal who uses Denkou for dastardly crimes and to release his old friends. Just when he is about to escape, while Astro Boy defeats his gang, Higeoyaji stops him in his tracks and beats him up.
- Denkou / Electro (English manga) / Zero (1963 dub) / The Light Ray Robot (1980 dub) (電光) - A robot who can turn invisible. Denkou was originally made by a scientist, but got stolen by the gangster Skunk Kusai, who sought to use Denkou for criminal purposes. Denkou had no concept of good or bad because of his initial upbringing under the criminal. Denkou was so naive that he allowed Skunk Kusai to attach a bomb-rigged belt onto them as part of the "game", only saved at the last minute by Astro.
- Saturn / Baron Von Hoodwink (1963 dub) / Devil King (1980 dub) / Gordon (2003 dub) (サターン, Satān) - An evil robot who kidnaps Princess Lollipop and punishes the other robots. Astro Boy rescued the princess and vanquished Saturn.
- Princess Odette / Princess Lollipop (dub) - A robot swan who can turn back into her normal self when everyone's asleep. She ran away from Hullabaloo Land so she can get away from Saturn. After Saturn and his creator are defeated, Princess Lollipop returned to her swan self and flew off in the blue sky. She is based on the character of the same name from Swan Lake.
- The Artificial Sun (人工太陽球, Jikō taiyō kyū) - A robot sun with octopus tentacles. Years ago, Dr. Ochanomizu invented the Artificial Sun for the planet Mars, then decided to reject the robot sun, but it was stolen by Kin Sankaku to threaten Earth. The sun was later destroyed by Astro Boy.
- Gadem / Gangor (dub) (ガデム, Gademu) - A robot centipede disguised as 47 wrestling robots. After it caused havoc on a ship and in the ocean, Astro Boy destroyed it and saved the people.
- Garon (ガロン) - A giant cosmic robot who came from a faraway planet. He landed on Earth as a meteor-shaped twisted pile of parts and Astro Boy and the scientists reconstructed him. During a thunderstorm, Garon revived. A corrupt scientist captured him and took him to a remote island in the Pacific Ocean, telling Garon to reconstruct the island in the image of his home planet, which Garon took to immediately. However, during his reconstruction of the island, he also began changing the atmosphere to match that of the planet, which turned out to be toxic to life on Earth. Astro managed to trick Garon to change the gravitational pull of the island to match that of his planet to complete the effect, causing Garon to hurl himself into space (his planet has a much lower gravitational pull than Earth).
- Kino / Abracadabra (dub) - A robot magician who puts on a great show for everyone, until a strange magician named Tenpercent wishes to know how Kino did his trick. Kino refuses knowing that the knowledge will be used for evil purposes. The man in response frames him for stealing art paintings from a museum. With Astro's help Kino provided the evidence that he was framed, and Tenpercent is arrested.
- President Rag (ラグ大統領, Ragu daitōryō) - The robot president of Guravia. He is the first robot to lead a nation, and is popular among his citizens. However, President Rag's good nature has made numerous anti-robot resistors want him dead.
- Cleopatra (クレオパトラ, Kureopatora) - A robot created by Dr. Ratsburton to fool the crimson brotherhood and the entire country of Egypt that she was brought back to life by the god Isis. Cleopatra along with her inventor were killed by a cave-in after Dr. Rasburton's plan failed.
- Garuda / Dunder (dub) (ガルダ) - A robot bird who destroys ships.
- Montblanc - One of the 7 strongest robots in the world. A robot mountain guide from Switzerland who is friends with Brando. While chopping wood, he met and was destroyed by Pluto.
- North #2 / Monar (dub) - One of the 7 strongest robots in the world. A robot butler from Scotland with six arms and six weapons. He was last seen killed by Pluto before he had the chance to finish him off.
- Brando - One of the 7 strongest robots in the world. A giant wrestling robot from Turkey who is friends with Montblanc and fights Pluto to avenge him. He is a big burly robot that has the ability to spin at high velocity and turn into a deadly sphere that grinds up anything it comes in contact with. Although he managed to damage Pluto, he was destroyed by him.
- Gesicht - One of the 7 strongest robots in the world. A robot detective from Germany who is made of indestructible zirconium, which also protects him from Pluto's deadly electric horns. He was assigned to arrest Pluto, but ended up destroyed by him when he was caught on Pluto's horns; Pluto merely pulled his horns in opposite directions to rip Gesicht's body in two.
- Hercules - One of the 7 strongest robots in the world. A robot gladiator from Greece. As an honorable warrior, he did not step down from Pluto's challenge, despite Epsilon's pleas.
- Epsilon / Photar (dub) - One of the 7 strongest robots in the world. In the original manga and 1963 anime, Epsilon is male. Being solar powered, he has nearly infinite power. Pluto took advantage of this and fought Epsilon during a thunderstorm, where the sun was blotted by thick clouds. Epsilon ran low on power and was eventually destroyed by Pluto. In the 2003 series he is reimagined as a female caretaker who protects Metro City's wildlife, most notably the marine animals.
- Bora - A mysterious and extremely strong robot with 2,000,000 horsepower. He can launch a destructive katabatic wind simply by screaming his own name. He is the robot who finally defeats Pluto, who sacrificed himself to save Astro Boy from almost certain destruction.
- Robio (ロビオ) - A robot who is in love with Robiette and does not like fighting. He and his brothers were created by Dr. Ijio. He was last seen with Robiette smashed, though their hearts are still beating. He is based on Romeo from Romeo and Juliet.
- Robiette (ロビエット, Robietto) - Chibolt's sister who has butterfly wings and is in love with Robio. She was last seen with Robio smashed, though their hearts are still beating. She is based on Juliet from Romeo and Juliet.
- Chibolt - A robot who is Robio's rival and Robiette's brother. He exploded after he and Astro had a duel. He is based on Tybalt from Romeo and Juliet.
- Atlas (アトラス, Atorasu) - A robot created by Dr. Ram. He adds the Omega Factor which would allow Atlas to defy the laws of robotics (which disallowed him from hurting humans) and commit several crimes. However, Atlas turns against his creator and leaves him to be burned by the flowing lava caused by an artificial volcanic eruption, but Astro manages to defeat Atlas.
- Dr. Ram / Don Tay (dub) - An Incan scientist who hates civilization. He invented Atlas to get revenge on a village in Mexico. Atlas turns against him and leaves him to be burned in the flowing lava caused by an artificial volcanic eruption. However, Astro manages to beat Atlas and save Dr. Ram, who realizes that destroying civilization is wrong.
- Black Lux / Sharkey Dirk (dub) - A man who leads a vendetta against robots. Black Lux and his gang set to destroy all robots, who he believed caused his mother's death. In the end, Astro found his missing mother, who turned out to be a robot herself who adopted the abandoned baby. Realizing his mistake, Black Lux reunited with his mom and vowed never to destroy any more robots.
- Führer ZZZ / Secret Agent 3-Z (dub) (ZZZ総統, ZZZ sōtō) - A criminal who happens to be a president's brother. He wants to assassinate all supreme scientists and presidents who would dare get in his way. He accidentally hurts his brother, but the president eventually forgives him.
- Kin Sankaku / Elia Belial (dub) - A film producer from an island who steals the Artificial Sun. His plan was successful until Astro Boy destroyed the Artificial Sun.
- J. C. Tenpercent - A magician and inventor of Hocupocus. He and Hocuspocus are responsible for stealing art paintings and framing Kino. Tenpercent was last seen arrested by the police.
- Deadcross (デッドクロス, Deddokurosu) - A villain who happens to be the inventor of Rag. He kidnapped Higeoyaji and Rag while Astro Boy was searching for them. Astro Boy stopped Deadcross by disguising himself as Rag and unmasking the villain.
- Reno (リノ, Rino) - A young teenager raised by robots who had him pretend to be a robot to act in their circus. The prospective mayor of Bella Notte was extremely anti-robot and after discovering Reno, took him away. However, Dr. Ochanomizu became his legal guardian and took custody of him.
- Sam Caesar - A scientist who rules a new Roman Empire. When Dr. Ochanomizu was about to escape, Brutus, invented by Caesar, caught one of the robots carrying bags full of treasure. He sent Dr. Ochanomizu to be fed by a fire-breathing robot lion. Astro Boy rescued him and defeated Caesar's entire army. He was last seen dead while Dr. Ochanomizu and Astro Boy escaped from the cave-in.
- Cosmic Crab / Space Crab (dub) (宇宙ガニ, Uchū gani) - A space crab from the Planet Gip Gip that is last seen destroyed.
- Toxor - A mist man, or gaseous being. He and other mist men possessed astronauts' body, controlling them. Toxor and the mist men were eventually frozen by Astro Boy and Dr. Ochanomizu's freeze machine.
- Koichi / Tommy Speed - A boy who rides the Silver Comet.
- Teddy Time - Dr. Time's son who befriends Astro Boy.
- Heck Ben - The son of Dr. Ben who time travels back to the American wild west. Heck Ben often appears as a cowboy in pioneer era western stories.
- Pura / Jimbo (dub) (プーラ, Pūra) - A baby elephant. Astro Boy helped Pura to get back to his home after he destroyed an out of controlled robot elephant.
- Bem / Beamo (dub) (ベム, Bemu) - An alien who is a fugitive from the planet Norico. He disguises himself as a baker, so he could get away from three scientists from his planet. He was last seen blown up with a fridge bomb on the sun.

== 1980 anime only ==
- Livian (リビアン, Ribian) - Livian is a female robot, originally created by Count Walpur Guiss to serve as a maid. She is an elegant refined robot, and under Guiss's ownership, she was Atlas's caretaker. After Atlas breaks free and rebuilds himself, she is rebuilt by him as an older space queen.
- Jump (ジャンプ, Janpu) - Jump is Astro's loyal pet and sidekick.
- Midori / Mindy (dub) (ミドリ) - Midori is Astro's classmate. She is one of the first human kids to befriend Astro, and she immediately welcomes him into her friend group.
- Black Jack / Dr. Roget (dub) (ブラック・ジャック, Burakku Jakku) - An outlaw surgeon.
- Nyōka / Niki (dub) (ニョーカ) - Niki was a robot similar to Astro in construction, as well as Astro's first crush.
- Rock Holmes (ロック・ホーム / 間久部緑郎, Rokku Hōmu / Rokurō Makube) - Rock is a recurring antagonist with psychic powers.

== 2003 anime only ==
- Robita / Nora (dub) (ロビタ) - Robita is Dr. Ochanomizu's assistant robot and Astro's guardian. While she can be skittish, she cares very much about Astro and Uran and provides guidance and information to them.
- Yūko Kisaragi (如月夕子, Kisaragi Yūko) - Yūko Kisaragi is Dr. Ochanomizu's assistant. She is the niece of detective Higeoyaji, and is usually seen with Momo, her robot ostrich and personal computer.
- Delta (デルタ, Deruta) - Delta is the leader of Metro City's Anti-Robot Robot Squad, a division of the Metro City Police dedicated to fight crime caused by robots. He is a stubborn but passionate officer and an ally to Astro Boy.
- Shadow (シャドウ) - Shadow is a robotic scientist who was created by Dr. Tenma. He was originally intended to be an assistant, but Shadow soon developed his own personality and thoughts. Shadow creates robots of his own to fight against Astro. Much like Dr. Tenma, Shadow believes Astro can evolve through combat and become the most powerful robot in the world
- Red (レッド, Reddo) - An arrogant, stylish, robot-hating general who serves as the main antagonist of the final arc. When his daughter Hannah gets hurt, Red wrongly blames their household servant robot. When rebellious robots form their own nation, Red leads military forces to battle them.
- Ena / Hannah (dub) (エナ) - Hannah is Duke Red's daughter. She is good friends with her household servant robot, much to her father's regret. She is very pro-robot and believes that robots and humans can work together for a better future.
