= List of Osamu Tezuka manga =

This is a list of Osamu Tezuka's manga in alphabetical order. The English translations of the names used are from the original names found on the official Osamu Tezuka website.

== 0-9 ==
Title	Year
21st Century Adventure	1970-1971

== A ==
Title	Year
Adventure Broadcasting Station	1960
Adventure of Rock, The	1952–1954
Adventures of Rubi, The	1969–1970
Afternoon, Little Chippo!	1957, 1973–1974
Age of Adventure	1951
Age of Great Floods, The	1955
Ah, We Three	1956–1957
Akebono-san	1959
Alabaster	1970–1971
Amazing 3, The	1965–1966
Ambassador Atom	1951–1952
Ambassador Magma	1965–1967
Angel Gunfighter	1949
Angel's Hill	1960–1961
Ant and the Giant, The	1961–1962
Apollo's Song	1970
Astro Boy	1952–1968
Astro Boy Chronicles	1967-1969
Astro Boy Special	1982
Atom Cat	1986
Ayako	1972–1973

== B ==
Title	Year
Bagi, the Boss of the Earth	1975
Baka Ichi	1971
Barbara	1973–1974
Benkei	1976
Big X	1963–1966
Biiko-chan	1957
Black Canyon	1951
Black Jack	1973–1983
Bomba!	1970
Bongo	1964–1965
Book of Human Insects, The	1970–1971
Brave Dan	1962
Buddha	1972–1983
Burunga I	1968–1969

== C ==
Title	Year
Cactus Kid, The	1951–1954
Calabash Komako	1957–1958
Captain Ken	1960–1961
Captain Ozma	1961–1964
Castle of Dawn, The	1959-1961
Chief Detective Kenichi	1954–1956
Cave In	1969
Clockwork Apple, The	1968-1973
Crater, The	1969-1970
Crime and Punishment (adaptation of Dostoevsky novel)	1953

== D ==
Title	Year
Detective Boy, Rock Holmes	1949
Devil Garon, The	1959–1962
Devil of the Earth, The	1954
Devil's Mountain	1972
Diary of Ma-chan	1946
Diletta	1968–1969
Don Dracula	1979
Donguri March	1959
Dororo	1967–1969
Double Tobii	1948
Dove, Fly Up to Heaven	1964–1967
Dr. Doronko	1976
Dr. Mars	1947
Dr. Thrill	1959
Duke Goblin	1985–1986
Dust 8	1972

== E ==
Title	Year
Earth War, The	1957-1958
Euphrates Tree, The	1973-1974

== F ==
Title	Year
Farewell, Alli	1981
Farewell, Night (Adios, Noches)	1985
Faust	1950
Film Lives On, The	1958–1959
Fire Valley	1960
Flying Ben	1966-1967
Fossil Island, The	1951
Fossil Man, The	1952
Fossil Man Strikes Back, The	1952
Four Fencers of the Forest, The	1948
Fusuke	1969-1970
Futureman Kaos	1978-1979

== G ==
Title	Year
Gacha Boy's Life Story	1970
Garbage War	1973
General Onimaru	1969
Get Out Of Here!	1972
Gold City	1950
Golden Trunk, The	1957
Goto Matabei	1954
Grand Dolls	1968
Gringo	1987
Gucchan & Paiko-san	1948
Gucchan	1956
Gum Gum Punch	1967–1969
Gūtarō's A Thousand and One Stories	1975

== H ==
Title	Year
Hikari	1959
Hit 'Em Hard	1979, 1980
How to Draw Osamu Tezuka Manga	1977
Hungry Blues	1975

== I ==
Title	Year
I am Sarutobi!	1960–1961
I.L	1969–1970
Ikki Mandara	1974–1975
Iron Road, The	1962–1963

== J ==
Title	Year
Jambo	1974
Jet King	1959
Jetter Mars	1977
Jungle Emperor	1950-1954
Jungle Taro	1958-1959
Junk Poetry	1969

== K ==
Title	Year
Kibando	1984
King Rocket	1948
Kodama-chan	1959–1960
Kokeshi Detective Agency	1957

== L ==
Title	Year
Land of the Tigerman	1969
Leaving for 1985	1985
Lemon Kid	1953
Leo-chan	1965–1967
Lion Books	1956–1957
Lips of Salome, The	1972
Little Wansa	1971–1972
Little Yokko's Here!	1962
Lost World	1948
Ludwig B	1987–1989
Lunatic Japan	1974–1975

== M ==
Title	Year
Maiden of Tatsugafuchi, The	1954–1955
Mako, Rumi, and Chi	1979–1981
Man From Mars, The	1952
Man Who Would Destroy The World, The	1954
Manga University	1950
Marvelous Melmo	1970–1972
Melody of Iron	1974–1975
Message to Adolf	1983–1985
Metamorphosis	1974–1977
Meteor Prince, The	1955–1956
Metropolis	1949
Microid S	1973
Midnight	1986–1987
Monster of the 38th Parallel, The	1953
Moony Man, The	1948
Ms. Sunflower	1956
MW	1976–1978
My Son-Goku	1952–1959
Mysterious Underground Men, The	1948

== N ==
Title	Year
Neo Faust	1988
New Treasure Island	1947
New World of Lulu, The	1951–1952
Nextworld	1951
Noman	1968
Number 7	1961–1963

== O ==
Title	Year
Ode to Kirihito	1970–1971
Osamu Tezuka Essay Collection	
Osamu Tezuka Lecture Collection	
Osamu Tezuka Novel Collection	
Osamu Tezuka's Special Manga Course	
Osamu Tezuka's Scenario Collection	
Osamu Tezuka Talk Collection	

== P ==
Title	Year
Paper Fortress	1974
People With Pistols on Their Heads	1952
Phoenix	1954–1988
Pink Angel	1957–1958
Pippy	1951–1953
Piron's Secret	1960–1961
Plains of Abusegahara, The	1950
Pornographic Pictures	
Prime Rose	1982–1983
Princess Knight [Shōjo Club]	1953–1956
Princess Knight [Nakayoshi]	1963–1966

== Q ==
Title	Year
Queen Eggplant	1954–1955
Queer Arabian Nights	1951

== R ==
Title	Year
Rags & Jewels	1957
Rainbow Fortress	1956–1957
Rainbow Parakeet, The	1981–1983
Rainbow Prelude	1958
Rally Up, Mankind!	1967–1968
Revolution	1973
Rinrin-chan	1960
Robin-chan	1954
Roppu-kun	1963–1965
Runaway Tanker, The	1969

== S ==
Title	Year
Sangoro of the Mountains	1958–1959
Say Hello to Bookila!	1985
Secrets of Osamu Tezuka's Manga	
Secrets of the Jungle	1948
SF Fancy Free	
SF Mix	
Shinsengumi	1963
Short Arabesque	
Shumari	1974–1976
Son of Godfather, The	1975
Sorry, Mama	1961–1963
Soyokaze-san	1955–1956
Spacemen's Base, The	1969
Spirit of the Wild Rose, The	1962
Stereotype	1973
Storm Fairy, The	1955–1957
Story of Tonkara Valley, The	1955–1956
Strange Boy, The	1961–1962
Super Taiheiki	1958–1959
Suspicion	1982
Swallowing the Earth	1968–1969

== T ==
Title	Year
Tail People	1949
Tale of the Miracle Forest	1949
Tales of the Glass Castle	1970
Tange Sazen	1954
Thief Akikazu Inoue, The	1979
Three-eyed One, The	1974–1978
Thunder Mask	1972–1973
Tiger Books	
Tomorrow the Birdmen	1971–1975
Topsy-Turvey Swordsmen	1952
Tree in the Sun, A	1981–1986
Triton of the Sea	1969–1972
Turtle Tales	
Twin Knights, The	1958–1959
Two Sides of a Human Being	1968

== U ==
Title	Year
Under the Air	1968–1970
Unico	1976–1979
Unico [First Grader]	1980–1984

== V ==
Title	Year
Vampires	1966–1969

== W ==
Title	Year
Weekly Detective, The	1959–1961
Whirlwind Z	1957–1958
White Apparition, The	1972
White Pilot, The	1961–1962
Wonder-kun	1954–1955
Wonder Three	1965–1966
The Wonderful Journey	1950
World in One Thousand Years, The	1948

== X ==
Title	Year
X-Point on the South Pacific	1953

== Y ==
Title	Year
Yakeppachi's Maria	1970

== Z ==
Title	Year
Zero Man	1959–1960

== See also ==
- Osamu Tezuka
- List of Osamu Tezuka anime
- Osamu Tezuka's Star System
