= Faust (manga) =

Manga by Osamu Tezuka

ファウスト (Fausuto)
- Genre: Horror, classical
- Manga
- Written by: Osamu Tezuka
- Published by: Fuji Shobo
- Published: January 15, 1950
- Volumes: 1

Faust (ファウスト, Fausuto) is a manga by Osamu Tezuka that was published in tankōbon form in 1950.

== Plot ==
Based on Johann Wolfgang von Goethe's closet play Faust, Osamu Tezuka came up with his own version of the classic German story.

In the manga, Mephisto is a proud, confident devil who is causing much havoc and violence in the world. One of his most sinister acts is sending angels to fall to Earth, making them fallen angels. Witnessing this, God grants new life to the fallen angel as she is reborn as Princess Margaret, daughter of the King: Charles V. God then confronts Mephisto and bets him that he can not take the soul of Heinrich Faust, God's favorite human at the time, to Hell. Sure of his ability, Mephisto agrees to God's wager and heads down to Earth to get Faust away from righteous pursuits so that he can take his soul.

On Earth, Faust has hit a roadblock in his studies. He believes that no matter how hard he studies, he won't be able to reach his goals. Before him, Mephisto appears as a black furred, white eared and tailed poodle. Turning into a kind of anthropomorphic animal, he offers to grant Faust's every desire. Faust signs a contract with Mephisto, agreeing that Mephisto can have his soul if Mephisto can satisfy everything that Faust desires.

The rest of the manga details Faust's journeys to win the love of Margaret, meet the demands of the King in finding the beautiful Goddess Helen, and blends Faust Part One and Faust Part Two together.

== Characters ==
NOTE: Character names are listed under the English translation of the Japanese names used in the manga, followed by a more proper English translation as found in translations of Goethe's Faust.

- Heinrich Faust: A scholar looking for a way to end human suffering in any way possible. He makes a deal with the devil Mephisto claiming that he can have his soul, but only after Faust experiences a moment of true bliss where he never, ever, wants that moment to end. Through his journeys, Faust is aided by the devil Mephisto who is often in the shape of a small, black furred, poodle.
- Mephisto: A devil from Hell causing much torment and mischief until approached by God with his wager. Often takes the form of a small black dog, or as an anthropomorphic dog-like humanoid while helping Faust achieve his goals.
- Doctor Hanamaru as "God": The Divine King of Heaven who orders Mephisto to try to sway Faust from a righteous path. His true motive, however, is to test Faust's will with the intent of proving that even when led astray, one can make their way back again and achieve redemption.
- Margaret/Gretchen: An angel who fell from Heaven, but was saved by God who reincarnated her as a human. She soon becomes Faust's love interest.
- King (German Emperor Charles V): A portly King of Germany who wants Faust to help bring him Helene from the Hartz Mountains during Walpurgis.
- Warenchin (Valentin): Margaret's brother who is not fond of Faust.
- Wagner: Faust's assistant and student who is with him when they are followed home by Mephisto, shaped as a poodle. He is also responsible for creating the Homunculus.
- High Priest
- Helene (Helen of Troy): Daughter of Zeus and Leda in Greek Mythology, "The Face that Launched 1,000 Ships", and is considered to be an epitome of beauty.
- Hiron (Chiron): The legendary centaur of Greek mythology. He is sought after by Faust in his search for Helene. In the manga, he can take both centaur and horse forms.
- Horukiasu

== Manga as an important cultural medium ==
When creating this manga, Osamu Tezuka applied a cartoony style of caricature to Goethe's masterpiece. He did this with the intent of helping manga become an important medium in Japanese culture. It allowed serious subject matter to be portrayed in a style that would normally be reserved for more light-hearted material.

== See also ==
- List of Osamu Tezuka manga
- Osamu Tezuka's Star System
