= Angel's Hill =

Japanese manga

- Cover of "Angel's Hill" from the Osamu Tezuka Manga Complete Works edition.

エンゼルの丘 (Enzeru no Oka)
- Genre: Fantasy
- Manga
- Written by: Osamu Tezuka
- Published by: Kodansha
- Magazine: Nakayoshi
- Original run: January 1960 – December 1961
- Volumes: 2

Angel's Hill (Japanese: エンゼルの丘, Hepburn: Enzeru no Oka) is a manga by Osamu Tezuka that began serialization in 1960.

== Plot ==
The story revolves around a mysterious place called "Angel's Island" that resides somewhere on the ocean seas. Living on Angel's Island are a species of merpeople that can live both in the sea and on land. They have the form of a human, but can breathe in water as well as on land. Luna is a princess of this species of mermaid living on Angel's Island, but is exiled for breaking some of their rules. As punishment, she is placed inside a sea shell, and set adrift across the sea.

While adrift, Luna is rescued from the sea shell when she is picked up by a passing ship. However, the people on the ship sell her into slavery, which causes Luna to lose her memory from the cruel treatment. Eiji Kusahara, the son of a wealthy Japanese family, finds Luna and rescues her from slavery, taking her into his home. There, she meets Eiji's younger sister, Akemi, who looks almost exactly like Luna. For some strange reason, Akemi is able to turn herself into a mermaid just like Luna on nothing more than a whim.

Before too long, mermaids from Angel's Island arrive and kidnap Eiji and Akemi, taking them back to the island. There, the sinister and deceitful Pyoma attempts to make Akemi a sacrificial offering, while Eiji meets Soleiu, Luna's older sister. Together, Eiji and Soleiu discover the mysteries behind Angel's Island.

== Characters ==
- Luna: The mermaid princess who is exiled for breaking the rules of Angel's Island.
- Akemi Kusahara: Younger sister of Eiji Kusahara who happens to look exactly like Luna.
- Eiji Kusahara: Son of the wealthy Kusahara family who rescues Luna from a cruel fate as a slave.
- Soleiu: Luna's older sister.
- Pyoma: A wicked woman who intends for her own son, Pirene, to be the King of Angel's Island.
- Chi-Chi:
- Coco:
- Tuck/Kalpis as "Fuguhei":
- Char:
- Better:
- Poseidon:

== See also ==
- Osamu Tezuka
- List of Osamu Tezuka manga
- List of Osamu Tezuka anime
- Osamu Tezuka's Star System
