= Brave Dan =

1962 manga by Osamu Tezuka

- Cover of "Brave Dan" from the Osamu Tezuka Manga Complete Works edition.

勇者ダン (Yuusha Dan)
- Genre: Adventure
- Manga
- Written by: Osamu Tezuka
- Published by: Shogakukan
- English publisher: NA: Digital Manga Publishing
- Magazine: Weekly Shōnen Sunday
- Original run: July 15, 1962 – December 23, 1962
- Volumes: 1

Brave Dan (勇者ダン, Yuusha Dan) is a manga by Osamu Tezuka that began serialization in 1962.

== Plot ==
In the wilderness of Hokkaido, the Ainu people of Japan live in harmony with nature. Kotan Nakamura is a young Ainu boy living peacefully until he meets a tiger one day. This tiger, Dan, has escaped from a train that was carrying him to a zoo. Together, they discover mysterious ruins hidden underneath the ground.

Within the ruins, Kotan and Dan discover an old man named Upopo living there. He tells the boy and the tiger about three keys to a fantastic treasure. As it so happens, the evil Sekkoku Kou is also searching for the treasure and shoots Upopo. Before he dies, Upopo gives one of the keys to Kotan.

Now, Kotan and Dan find themselves involved in an ugly battle as numerous villains track them down to try to get the three keys so they can claim the treasure.

== Characters ==
- Kotan Nakamura: An ainu boy who befriends an escaped tiger with whom he goes on adventures with.
- Dan: A tiger that has escaped from a train carrying him to a zoo.
- Upopo: A mysterious old man living in a hidden, underground ruin who knows the secret to finding a great treasure.
- Sekkoku Kou: A villain who wants to obtain the three keys that will unlock a great treasure.
- Doctor Zoger
- Doctor Hanamaru as himself
- Tamayo

== See also ==
- List of Osamu Tezuka manga
- Osamu Tezuka
- Osamu Tezuka's Star System
