= The Fossil Island =

Japanese manga

- Cover of The Fossil Island from the Osamu Tezuka Manga Complete Works edition.

化石島 (Kasekitō)
- Genre: Adventure
- Manga
- Written by: Osamu Tezuka
- Published by: Tokodo
- Published: December 5, 1951
- Volumes: 1

The Fossil Island (化石島, Kasekitō) is a Japanese manga by Osamu Tezuka that was published as a book in 1951.

== Plot ==
At the mysterious Fossil Island, three visitors have come for a visit. Newspaper Reporter Rock, Songwriter Kodama, and manga artist Osamu Tezuka. On the island are many rocks shaped like human people. When each one of them witness a different rock, each with their own name on them, the three enter into a dream like world. In Rock's dream world, he finds himself partnered with the great detective Sherlock Holmes. Together, they race against the French master thief Arsene Lupin for a sculpture that has been hidden away. In Osamu Tezuka's dream world, the consumption of ancient foods take him to a world where humans and animals have switched brains. Now the humans all act like animals, while the animals all act like humans.

For Kodama, she finds herself robbed of her own body by Eros, the God of Love, who is in the form of an old man. Without her body, her spirit ascends to Heaven and to an amazing adventure. Two more stories follow after these, ending with the introduction of one of Tezuka's stars from his Star System: Pippy.

== Characters ==
- Rock
- Osamu Tezuka
- Kodama
- Sherlock Holmes
- Arsene Lupin
- Kao Sekken as "Eros Iwasaku"
- Amore
- Rotte
- Sam
- Morgan

== Other manga ==
In the Osamu Tezuka Manga Complete Works release of "The Fossil Island", two of Tezuka's short stories were added in with the book: Robin-chan and The Maiden of Tatsugafuchi.

== See also ==
- List of Osamu Tezuka manga
- Osamu Tezuka
- Osamu Tezuka's Star System
