= Bomba! =

Japanese manga

ボンバ! (Bonba!)
- Genre: Horror
- Manga
- Written by: Osamu Tezuka
- Published by: Kodansha
- English publisher: NA: Kodansha USA
- Magazine: Bessatsu Shōnen Magazine
- Original run: September 1970 – December 1970
- Volumes: 1

Bomba! (ボンバ!, Bonba!) is a manga by Osamu Tezuka that began serialization in 1970.

== Plot ==
Tetsu Otani is a junior high school student with a weak heart. Despite the hardships of being so meek at school, he has an intense crush on one of his teachers: Reiko Mizushima. However, one of his least favorite teachers, Kito, intends to propose to her. Since Kito is very violent and often pushes Tetsu around, the thought of him and Reiko together infuriates Tetsu. Before him appears a ghostly white horse, and the next day, Kito is found dead.

Tetsu realizes that this horse is the ghost of Bomba, a horse Tetsu's father told him he was charged to take care of during the Pacific War. Now, whenever Tetsu feels intense hatred for someone, Bomba will appear and cause that person to die.

== Characters ==
- Tetsu Otani: A young boy who discovers that he can summon the phantom horse, Bomba, whenever he feels intense hatred towards someone, causing that person to die.
- Shunzo Otani: Tetsu's father who was ordered to take care of Bomba back during the Pacific War. He is weak hearted, just as Tetsu is.
- Mrs. Otani (known as Tetsu's mother): Tetsu's mother who has a large and overbearing physical appearance.
- Bomba: A horse who died many years ago and was cared for by Shunzo Otani when he was alive. His spirit appears as a phantom whenever Tetsu feels intense hatred towards someone.
- Reiko Mizushima: Tetsu's favorite teacher in junior high school, and who he has an intense crush on.
- Kito: A violent teacher in Tetsu's junior high school who has hopes of proposing to Reiko Mizushima.
- Captain Monobe
- Shigure

== Publication ==
Kodansha USA published the manga in North America.

== See also ==
- List of Osamu Tezuka manga
- Osamu Tezuka
- Osamu Tezuka's Star System
