= The Film Lives On =

Manga by Osamu Tezuka

- Cover of The Film Lives On from the Osamu Tezuka Manga Complete Works edition.

フィルムは生きている (Firumu wa Ikiteiru)
- Genre: Slice of life
- Manga
- Written by: Osamu Tezuka
- Published by: Gakushu Kenkyu Sha
- Magazine: Chu-ichi and Chu-ni Course
- Original run: April 1958 – August 1959
- Volumes: 1

The Film Lives On (フィルムは生きている, Firumu wa Ikiteiru) is a manga by Osamu Tezuka that began serialization in 1958.

== Plot ==
The setting is 1950s Japan and young Musashi Miyamoto has come to Tokyo with visions of becoming a manga filmmaker. When he visits a manga filmmaking studio, he meets veteran manga filmmaker Matsuma Dan. Musashi shows Matsuma his work, but is quickly dismissed by Matsuma who claims his work lacks "vitality" in its movements.

Disappointed, Musashi doesn't give up and continues to practice the art of manga filmmaking. While in Tokyo, he meets Kojiro Sasaki, another young boy yearning to be a manga filmmaker. The two become friends almost instantly, but after a quarrel, they split up and become fierce rivals to see who can make it in the manga filmmaking business.

More trouble falls on Musashi when he runs afoul of a Yakuza family in Tokyo. He meets a beautiful young girl named Otsu, but as fate would have it, she is the daughter of a Yakuza family's leader. As payback, the yakuza members burn Musashi's 50,000 manga film cells, destroy his movie making equipment, and damage his eyes in the process.

Hurt and beaten, Musashi still finds the strength to move on. Thinking of his beloved horse, Ao, back in his hometown, Musashi begins anew with his manga films by making ones about Ao.

== Characters ==
- Musashi Miyamoto: A country boy who has come to Tokyo to enter the field of "manga film" making. Despite setbacks, he finds the strength to continue following his dream.
- Kojiro Sasaki as himself: Another student of manga filmmaking who makes friends with Musashi in Tokyo. After a falling out, the two of them become rivals to see who can make it big in manga films.
- Otsu: Daughter of a Tokyo Yakuza family's leader who meets Musashi, but her yakuza family does not like her being with Musashi.
- Frankenstein as Matsuma Dan: A veteran manga filmmaker who is dismissive of Musashi's work, believing it to lack life and vitality.
- Seijuro Yoshioka
- Denshichiro Yoshioka
- Baiken Shishido
- Shonisuke Bandai
- Buku Bukk as Matahachi Honiden
- Ao: Musashi's horse from back home. Thinking about him helps Musashi to have the strength to continue working in manga film making.

== Manga animation vs. anime ==
In the late 1950s animation in Japan was undergoing many rapid changes. While writing this manga, Osamu Tezuka was working with Toei Doga (now known as Toei Animation) to produce the animated feature film "Hsu Yu Chi" ("The Journey West") also known as "Monkey". The film was based on the original legend of Son-Goku and the manga version Tezuka had created years before. This film was brought over to the United States under the name "Alakazam the Great".

Working with Toei inspired Tezuka to venture into animation a number of other times later down the road until his death in 1989. It was from his experience in animation that Tezuka decided to create The Film Lives On.

Before the 1960s the art form was originally called "Manga Films" (漫画映画 / まんがえいが, Manga Eiga) or "Doga" (動画 / どうが, Douga) ("animated cartoon") became known as "Animation" (アニメーション, Animeeshon) and then finally "Anime" (アニメ, Anime) for short. Since becoming recognized overseas, the term "Anime" has been used to describe Japanese animation ever since.

== See also ==
- List of Osamu Tezuka anime
- List of Osamu Tezuka manga
- Osamu Tezuka
- Osamu Tezuka's Star System
