= Birdman Anthology =

Manga by Osamu Tesuka

- Cover of Birdman Anthology volume 2 from the Osamu Tezuka Manga Complete Works edition.

鳥人大系 (Chōjin Taikei)
- Genre: Science fiction
- Manga
- Written by: Osamu Tezuka
- Published by: Hayakawa Publishing Corporation
- Magazine: SF Magazine
- Original run: March 1971 – February 1975
- Volumes: 2

Birdman Anthology (Japanese: 鳥人大系, Hepburn: Chōjin Taikei) is a manga by Osamu Tezuka that began serialization in 1971.

== Plot ==
In the future, birds have taken over Earth and replaced human kind as the dominant species. With the assistance of bird-like aliens, the birds of Earth gained increased intelligence in 1975 and began to attack humans. Now humans are treated as livestock by the birds who have moved on to create their own society with laws, currency, countries, and class systems. Ironically, the birds are following the same path as humans did.

Now, the meat-eating predatorial birds and the insect and grain eating birds have begun a war amongst each other that has no end in sight. As they fight, aliens begin to consider what species should replace the birds as the dominant species of Earth in this science fiction thriller.

== Characters ==
- Komatsu Sakuemon no Josadatsne
- Oberon
- Liz
- Boku
- Nichora
- Pororo
- Beglar Yamaneko
- Police Inspector Mozz
- Rap
- Dobludo Chief

== Availability in English ==
The manga is currently published in English by Ablaze Books under the title, 'Tomorrow the Birds'.

== Chapters ==
1. Uroronka Domestica Ignis (ウロロンカ・ドメスティカ・イグニス, Uroronka Domestica Igunisu)
2. Raruz Fusukusu Ignis (ラルス・フスクス・イグニス, Raruz Fusukusu Igunisu)
3. Pyromanic Magpī (パイロマニアック・マグピー, Pairomanikku Magpī)
4. Long, Long Ago...So Blissful (むかしむかし……めでたしめでたし, Mukashi Mukashi……Medetashi Medetashi)
5. Oberon and Me (オーベロンと私, Ōberon to Watashi)
6. Turudos Merura Sapiens (Black Bird) (トゥルドス・メルラ・サピエンス(ブラック・バード), Turudosu Merura Sapiensu (Burakku Bādo))
7. On Roteshia (ローデシアにて, Rōteshia Ni te)
8. Spokesman (スポークスマン, Supōkusuman)
9. The Dobludo Assessment Committee's Appeal (ドゥブルゥド査定委員会への要請, Dūburūdo Sateiiin e no Yōsei)
10. Uzuragaoka (うずらが丘)
11. Kuropatīa Hitiarumu (クロパティア・ピティアルム)
12. Pororo Story (ポロロ伝, Pororo Den)
13. Mutant (ミュータント, Myūtanto)
14. Falco Chinnuncruz Morutsus (ファルコ・チンヌンクルス・モルツス, Faruko Chinnunkurusu Morutsusu)
15. Red Beak Party (赤嘴党, Akaishitō)
16. Kamone no Jongalasan (カモメのジョンガラサン, Kamone no Jongalasan)
17. Blue Human (ブルー・ヒューマン, Burū Hyūman)
18. The Ballad of Rap and Wilta (ラップとウィルダのバラード, Rapu to Wiruta no Barādo)
19. Dobludo's Assessment Committee Disciplinary Motion (ドゥブルゥドへの査定委員会懲罰動議, Dūburūdo no Dūburūdo Sateiiin e Chōbatsu Dōgi)

== See also ==
- List of Osamu Tezuka manga
- Osamu Tezuka
- Osamu Tezuka's Star System
