= The Devil of the Earth =

Japanese manga

地球の悪魔 (Chikyuu no Akuma)
- Genre: Action, adventure, science fiction
- Manga
- Written by: Osamu Tezuka
- Published by: Kodansha; Akita Shoten
- Magazine: Shōnen Shōjo Bokeno
- Published: January 1954
- Volumes: 1

The Devil of the Earth (地球の悪魔, Chikyuu no Akuma) is a Japanese action adventure shōnen manga by Osamu Tezuka that was published in 1954.

== Plot ==
In a small village, under the supervision of Dr. Takano, construction of an underground city begins in preparation for nuclear war. After a local child is killed when struck by one of the construction trucks brothers Eiji and Eizo are forced to take part in a conspiracy related to the construction. Later, a mysterious figure calling himself "Demonbirth" appears and things get more complicated.

== Characters ==
- Eiji: One of two brothers caught in a range of conspiracies revolving around the underground city's construction.
- Eizou: Eiji's brother who is also caught up in the events surrounding the underground city's construction.
- Rock as "Kenbo"
- Doctor Takano: The scientist leading the construction of the underground city.
- Sumiko
- Demonbirth: A mysterious, masked man who appears in the small village for unknown reasons.

== See also ==
- List of Osamu Tezuka manga
- Osamu Tezuka
- Osamu Tezuka's Star System
