= Bōken Ō =

Japanese manga magazine by Shueisha

- Cover of the inaugural February 1949 issue of Bōken Ō
- Categories: Shōnen manga
- Frequency: Monthly
- First issue: 1949-02
- Final issue: 1983
- Company: Akita Shoten
- Country: Japan
- Based in: Tokyo
- Language: Japanese

Bōken Ō (Japanese: 冒険王; lit. 'Adventure King') was a monthly magazine for youth published by Akita Shoten between 1949 and 1983. It was among the first generation of children's comic magazines after World War II in Japan and was initially focused on publishing illustrated prose and emonogatari and then shifted to manga.

== History ==
The magazine was initially founded under the title Shōnen Shōjo Bōkenō (少年少女冒険王) and was eventually renamed Bōken Ō. Nobumichi Akutsu acted as chief editor of the magazine for decades and worked extensively with Osamu Tezuka.

The magazine initially published some of the biggest hits of emonogatari during its peak, among them the science fiction series Sabaku no Maō by Tetsuji Fukushima. The magazine's editor gave Fukushima American comics as a reference for the series. In the early 1950s, it shifted more and more towards manga. The judo manga Igaguri-kun by Eiichi Fukui, serialized between 1952 and 1954, became the top selling manga series at the time, brought Bōken Ō to a circulation of 300.000 per month and fueled a surge in judo manga. In 1952, in response to the magazine's success, Manga Ō (漫画王, "Manga King") was established as a sister magazine to Bōken Ō.

From the 1960s on, the magazine had a focus on manga adaptations of tokusatsu films and news about anime. After its cancellation, the magazine turned into a magazine reporting about anime.

== Legacy ==
Animation director Hayao Miyazaki read the magazine in his childhood and was inspired by works like Sabaku no Maō and Tezuka's Taiheiyō X Ten (Point).

== Features ==
Among the series featured in the magazine were:

- Sabaku no Maō by Tetsuji Fukushima (1949-1956)
- Age of Adventure by Osamu Tezuka (1951-1953)
- Byakkō Kamen by Tomohika Oka (1951-1954)
- Yama kara Kita Kappa by Noboru Baba (1951-1954)
- Igaguri-kun by Eiichi Fukui (1952-1954)
- Taiheiyō X Ten (Point) by Osamu Tezuka (1953)
- Chikyu no Akuma by Osamu Tezuka (1954)
- Lost World by Osamu Tezuka (1955)
- Majin Garon by Osamu Tezuka (1959-1962)
- Yuuyake Banchō by Ikki Kajiwara and Toshio Shoji
- Cyborg 009 by Shotaro Ishinomori
- Rival no Hata by Jirō Tsunoda (1968)
- Dororo by Osamu Tezuka (1969)
- Niji wo yobu Ken by Jirō Tsunoda and Ikki Kajiwara (1969-1970)
- Submarine Super 99 by Leiji Matsumoto (1970-1972)
- Thunder Daiō by Mitsuteru Yokoyama (1971-1972)
- Space Battleship Yamato by Leiji Matsumoto (1974-1975)
- Getter Robo G by Go Nagai and Ken Ishikawa (1975-1976)
