= Angel Gunfighter =

Japanese manga

- Cover of "Angel Gunfighter" from the Osamu Tezuka Manga Complete Works edition.

拳銃天使 (Kenjū Tenshi)
- Genre: Western
- Manga
- Written by: Osamu Tezuka
- Published by: Tokodo
- Published: April 20, 1949
- Volumes: 1

Angel Gunfighter (拳銃天使, Kenjū Tenshi) is a Japanese single volume manga written and illustrated by Osamu Tezuka and published on April 20, 1949, by Tokodo.

== Plot ==
The rogue cop Ham Egg is plotting to take over a small town on the border region between New Mexico and Arizona. Only one thing stands in his way: a Native American sharpshooter known as "Monster". Aiding Monster are two other young sharpshooters, Anna and Jim, who combat Ham Egg and his gang to end corruption and liberate the town.

== Characters ==
Monster
A Native American who disguises himself as a masked cowboy to thwart Ham Egg's plot.
Anna
A female sharpshooter who helps Monster in his battle.
Jim
A young gunman who is assisting Monster in his fight for the town's freedom.
Ham Egg
A dastardly cop in the small town who hopes to take it over with the help of the mayor.
Baudelaire
Frederic Satton

== See also ==
- Osamu Tezuka
- List of Osamu Tezuka manga
- Osamu Tezuka's Star System
