= MW (film) =

- Directed by: Hitoshi Iwamoto
- Written by: Tetsuya Ôishi; Shinzô Matsuhashi
- Based on: MW by Osamu Tezuka
- Produced by: Shinzô Matsuhashi
- Starring: Hiroshi Tamaki; Takayuki Yamada
- Cinematography: Takuro Ishizaka; Nobuhiro Sako
- Edited by: Masashi Asahara
- Music by: Yoshihiro Ike
- Release date: July 4, 2009
- Running time: 129 minutes
- Country: Japan
- Language: Japanese

MW is a 2009 live-action Japanese film released in 2009 and based on the manga of the same name by Osamu Tezuka. The film was directed by Hitoshi Iwamoto. The film was shot in Kantō region for 40 days, and the car chase scene was shot in Bangkok.

== Casts ==
- Hiroshi Tamaki as Michio Yūki
- Takayuki Yamada as Yūtarō Garai
- Yusuke Yamamoto as Satoshi Mizohata
- Rio Yamashita as a girl at a church
- Shingo Tsurumi as Matsuo
- Ryo Ishibashi as Kazuyuki Sawaki
- Yuriko Ishida as Kyōko Makino
