= Age of Adventure =

Japanese manga series by Osamu Tezuka

- Cover of "Age of Adventure" from the Osamu Tezuka Manga Complete Works edition.

冒険狂時代 (Bōken-kyō Jidai)
- Genre: Adventure
- Manga
- Written by: Osamu Tezuka
- Published by: Kodansha
- English publisher: NA: Digital Manga Publishing
- Magazine: Bōken Ō
- Original run: January 12, 1951 – August, 1953
- Volumes: 2

Age of Adventure (冒険狂時代, Bōken-kyō Jidai; lit. "Crazed Adventurers Era") is a manga by Osamu Tezuka that began serialization in 1951.

== Plot ==
In the year 1876, a young boy named Takonosuke Arashi joins a Japanese envoy on their way to negotiate trades with the USA. However, en route to Washington D.C., the envoy is attacked by pirates in the Caribbean Sea. Takonosuke and the other survivors receive half of a treasure map from the British pastor Picar. Before anyone can reach safety, a massive tornado swallows them up and scatters them across the US, sending Takonosuke to the Nevada desert.

In Nevada, bar owner Ham Egg and outlaw Wild Bill Hecock get wind of the torn treasure map and join the race for the rest of it. Others soon join the quest for the whole map including Count Monte Christo, Arsene Lupin, and more in a mad chase around the world.

== Characters ==
- Takonosuke Arashi
- Monte Christo
- Pochi/Shiro/Pesu/Inu (the dog has four names)
- Duke Red as "Wild Bill Hecock"
- Ham Egg as himself
- Princess Furari
- Doctor Yashimu
- Aritake Chikara as "Louise Bamba"
- Princess Maria
- Panther in Morocco
- Arsene Lupin

== See also ==
- List of Osamu Tezuka manga
- Osamu Tezuka
- Osamu Tezuka's Star System
