= The Adventure of Rock =

Japanese manga series

- Cover of The Adventure of Rock volume 1 from the Osamu Tezuka Manga Complete Works edition.

ロック冒険記 (Rokku Bōken-ki)
- Genre: Adventure
- Manga
- Written by: Osamu Tezuka
- Published by: Kodansha
- Magazine: Shōnen Club
- Original run: July 1952 – April 1954
- Volumes: 2

The Adventure of Rock (ロック冒険記, Rokku Bōken-ki) is a manga by Osamu Tezuka that began serialization in 1952.

== Plot ==
In the year 19XX, a new celestial body has been discovered in the same orbit as Earth. Dubbed "Planet Deimon" after its discoverer, Doctor Deimon, the planet's orbit soon slows, coming into close proximity with Earth. After a severe storm, the planet becomes Earth's second satellite.

Doctor Deimon's son, Rock, organizes an expedition to explore the new planet and discovers that there are two races of sentient beings living on Deimon. The "Epumu", a race of avian people with the ability to fly, and the "Ruboroom", a race of metamorphic clay men who are slaves to the "Epumu".

After his first journey to Deimon, Rock adopts a baby "Epumu" chick named "Chiko" and raises him, learning more about Deimon culture and the differences between human and "Epumu" civilization. However, as the conflict between the people of Earth and the people of Deimon escalate, Rock becomes the ambassador for the two worlds and attempts to find a way to bring peace to everyone.

== Characters ==
- Rock as himself
- Daisuke
- Mirum
- Tonanshipei as himself
- Chiko
- Higeoyaji as himself

== See also ==
- List of Osamu Tezuka manga
- Osamu Tezuka's Star System
