= Noboru Baba =

Japanese manga artist

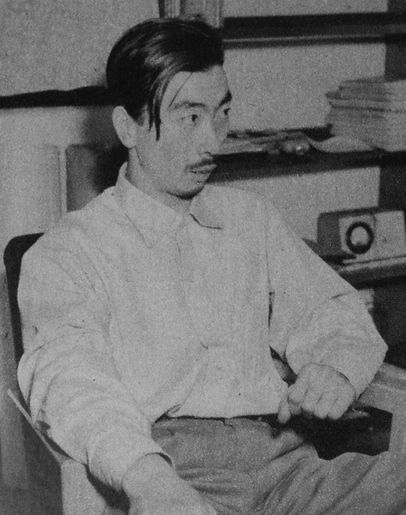
- Noboru Baba in 1953
- Born: October 18, 1927; Sannohe, Aomori Prefecture, Japan
- Died: April 7, 2001; Tokyo, Japan
- Occupation: Manga artist

Noboru Baba (馬場のぼる, Baba Noboru; October 18, 1927 – April 7, 2001) was a Japanese manga artist and writer. He is best known for his long-running four-panel newspaper comic Baku-san and for the acclaimed children’s picture book series 11 Piki no Neko (Eleven Cats). Active from the postwar period through the late 20th century, Baba was often referred to as one of the “Three Crows of Children’s Manga,” alongside Osamu Tezuka and Eiichi Fukui.

== Life and career ==
Noboru Baba was born in Sannohe in Aomori Prefecture in 1927. The youngest of three siblings, he displayed an early talent for drawing and was particularly inspired by Suihō Tagawa’s manga Norakuro, which would leave a lasting impression on his approach to animal characters. He became friends with children's writer Shigeru Shiraki, who was from the same town as him. After graduating from Aomori Prefectural Aomori High School, Baba enrolled at Tokyo Fine Arts School (now Tokyo University of the Arts). His studies were interrupted when he was drafted into military service during the Second World War.

Following the war, Baba returned to Aomori and took a job at the regional newspaper Tō-Ō Nippō, where he contributed illustrations and comic strips. His debut as a professional manga artist came in the last 1940s with work published in Shin Nihon Manga. In 1950, he relocated to Tokyo to pursue his career full-time, motivated by Shigeru Shiraki. When he started his career as a manga artist, he published popular children's manga like Posto-kun and Būtan. Eventually, he started drawing manga also for other newspapers and weekly magazines.

In the early 1950s, Noboru Baba was an active member of the Tokyo Children’s Manga Association (Tokyo jidō manga kai), an influential group of children’s manga artists formed to improve their standing within the publishing industry. Alongside notable contemporaries like Eiichi Fukui and Osamu Tezuka, Baba frequently socialized and collaborated with other leading cartoonists of the time. The group organized events for fans and supported one another through research, trips, and social gatherings. Baba acted as a mediator in a notorious conflict between Tezuka and fellow artist Eiichi Fukui, stepping in to defuse a confrontation after Tezuka publicly mocked Fukui in his series Manga Classroom (1952-1954). Baba later appeared in Tezuka’s own comic depiction of the incident, alongside Fukui, as a figure tying up Tezuka’s alter ego in protest. Baba also delivered the eulogy at Tezuka's funeral in 1989. Alongside Tezuka and Eiichi Fukui, Baba was hailed as one of the "Three Crows of Children's Manga" (Jidō Mangakai no Sanbagarasu) in the postwar era.

In 1967, Baba published the first volume of 11 Piki no Neko (Eleven Cats), a humorous picture book about a group of mischievous, scheming cats who work together and occasionally betray each other in pursuit of food, adventure, or survival. The book became a bestseller and led to five sequels, as well as animated adaptations and stage plays. This series, which ran until 1996, solidified Baba’s reputation as one of Japan’s most important creators of children's literature.

Baba gained widespread readership with Baku-san, a four-panel comic strip featuring a gentle elephant working as a salaryman. Serialized in the newspaper Nihon Keizai Shimbun, the strip ran between 1970 and 1984.

Noboru Baba died of stomach cancer at his home in Nerima, Tokyo, on April 7, 2001, at age 73. His final work, Budōbatake no Ao-san, was published posthumously in May 2001.

== Legacy ==
Noboru Baba remains a widely respected figure in Japanese popular culture and literature. His distinctive appearance, often sporting a hat and mustache, made him a recognizable personality on quiz shows and television dramas. Especially the Eleven Cats series has continued to be reprinted and adapted into various media, including animated films, puppet theater, and school performances. The original books remain staples in Japanese libraries and classrooms. The six volumes of the series sold more than 3 million copies.

He has won several awards for his work over decades:

- 1955: 1st Shogakukan Manga Award for Būtan
- 1963: 11th Sankei Children's Book Culture Award for the picture book Kitsune Mori no Yamaotoko
- 1968: 15th Sankei Children's Book Culture Award for the first 11-piki no Neko
- 1973: Bungeishunjū Manga Award for Baku-san and 11-piki no Neko to Ahōdori
- 1979: Minister of Health and Welfare Award / Child Welfare Culture Encouragement Prize for Buta Tanuki Kitsune Neko
- 1981: Aomori Prefecture Commendation
- 1985: Elba Prize at the Bologna International Children's Book Fair for Emaki Ehon 11-piki no Neko Marason Taikai
- 1989: 17th Daily Tōhoku Award
- 1993: 22nd Japan Cartoonists Association Award / Minister of Education, Science and Culture Prize
- 1995: Medal with Purple Ribbon
- 1997: 18th Yomiuri International Cartoon Contest / Selection Committee Special Prize
- 1998: Named Honorary Citizen of Sannohe
- 2000: 53rd Tōō Award Special Prize
- 2001 (posthumous): Order of the Rising Sun, 4th Class, Gold Rays with Rosette

In his hometown of Aomori, a major collection of Baba’s manuscripts, sketches, and publications is preserved at the Aomori Prefectural Library. Exhibitions dedicated to his work are regularly held, and public readings of his picture books continue to be popular. The Aomori Museum of Art for example dedicated a retrospective exhibition to him in 2009.

His Eleven Cats series has been translated into French. Though he is less well known internationally than some of his contemporaries, Baba is frequently cited in Japan as a formative figure in both postwar manga and modern picture book publishing. His influence can be traced in the work of later generations of artists. Keiji Nakazawa, known for his series Barefoot Gen, read his work.

== Selected works ==
=== Manga ===
Title	Year	Notes	Refs
Ōgon Washi	ca. 1948	Published by Shobunsha in 1 vol.	
Posto-kun (ポストくん)	1950–1954	Serialized in Omoshiro Book	
Yama kara Kita Kappa (山から来た河童)	1951–1954	Serialized in Bōken Ō	
Būtan (ブウタン)	1954–1957	Serialized in Yōnen Book	
Rokusan Tengoku (ろくさん天国)	1961–1967	Serialized in Weekly Manga Times	
Baku-san (バクさん)	1970–1984	Serialized in Nihon Keizai Shimbun	

=== Picture books ===
Title	Year	Notes	Refs
Kitsune Mori no Yamaotoko (きつね森の山男)	1963		
11-piki no Neko (11ぴきのねこ)	1967–1996	Published in 6 vol.	
Buta Tanuki Kitsune Neko (ぶたたぬききつねねこ)	1978		
Budōbatake no Ao-san (ぶどう畑のアオさん)	2001		
