= 11 Piki no Neko =

Japanese picture book series

- Cover of the first book of the series
- 11 Piki no Neko; 11 Piki no Neko to Ahōdori; 11 Piki no Neko to Buta; 11 Piki no Neko Fukuro no Naka; 11 Piki no Neko to Henna Neko; 11 Piki no Neko Doronko
- Author: Noboru Baba
- Country: Japan
- Language: Japanese
- Publisher: Koguma Publishing
- Published: 1967—1996

11 Piki no Neko (Japanese: 11ぴきのねこ; lit. "Eleven Cats") is a series of picture books created by Noboru Baba and published by Koguma Publishing.

== Books ==
The first and eponymous book was published in 1967, and was followed by five others: 11 Piki no Neko to Ahōdori (11ぴきのねことあほうどり) (1972), 11 Piki no Neko to Buta (11ぴきのねことぶた) (1976), 11 Piki no Neko Fukuro no Naka (11ぴきのねこ ふくろのなか) (1982), 11 Piki no Neko to Henna Neko (11ぴきのねことへんなねこ) (1989), and 11 Piki no Neko Doronko (11ぴきのねこ どろんこ) (1996). In the year the last one was published, Koguma released a box set containing the six books.

Additionally, an emaki book, 11 Piki no Neko Marathon Taikai (11ぴきのねこ マラソン大会, 11 Piki no Neko Marason Taikai), was released in 1992 and re-released in 2011; a karuta book was released in 1994; and three post card books were released in 1986, 1998, and 2001 by Koguma.

== Reception ==
The first book received the Sankei Children's Book Award a year after its release. In 1973 11 Piki no Neko to Ahōdori was awarded the Bungeishunjū Manga Award. In 1985 11 Piki no Neko Marathon Taikai won a special mention at the BolognaRagazzi Awards. The International Federation of Library Associations and Institutions (IFLA) requested the Children and Young Adults Section of the Japan Library Association to select ten books "which have been read by many children over many years" in Japan. In 2013, IFLA published a book titled The World Through Picture Books and included the first book from the series as the fourth most important picture book of Japan.

== Adaptations ==
Group TAC adapted the two first book of the series into anime films: the first was released on July 19, 1980, and the second on August 27, 1986. The first one was directed by Shiro Fujimoto and the second by Tameo Ogawa, while Yoshitake Suzuki wrote the screenplay for both versions. Hiromi Go and Tōru Furuya dubbed the main role for the first and the second film respectively. Both films were dubbed into German and released by Taurus Video.

In 1969, Hisashi Inoue adapted the book into a puppetry show with musical composition by Hiroshi Aoshima that was broadcast by NHK. It was made into a stage play and Theatre Echo performed it in 1971 and 1973. Ongaku no Tomo-sha published the play into a "choir version" (合唱版) book in 1985; it was republished in 1998 and 2007. In 1989 Komatsuza reenacted the play and it along with Horipro produced a new show in 2012 for Inoue's 77th anniversary.
