= Tetsuji Fukushima =

Japanese manga artist

Tetsuji Fukushima (Japanese: 福島 鉄次, romanized: Fukushima Tetsuji ; February 19 1914-1992) was a Japanese manga artist.

Fukushima was born in the Fukushima Prefecture. From January 1949 to February 1956, his science fiction comic series Sabaku no Maō ( Japanese: 砂漠の魔王, lit. 'Demon King of the Desert' ) appeared in the Bōken Ō magazine by Akita Shoten. He was inspired for this manga by the Middle Eastern tale of Aladdin and the Magic Lamp. Sabaku no Maō was also published in nine anthologies after the magazine publication. The manga's drawing style was influenced by American comics, which the editor of magazine had bought from the occupation army and given to Fukushima as a reference.

Hayao Miyazaki cited an episode in Sabaku no Maō as a great inspiration for his film The Castle in the Sky: "As a student, I read it [Sabaku no Maō] over and over again with a pounding heart. There was an episode about a gemstone that gave you the power to fly. I was so moved by it that I wanted to make a film about a magic stone."

Fukushima's other works include Inazuma Dōji (いなずま童子; 1954), Kaijin Z (怪人Z) and Shippū Kenshi (疾風剣士; 1956–1957).
