= Message to Adolf =

Japanese manga series

- Cover to the first volume in the "Osamu Tezuka Manga Complete Works" edition

アドルフに告ぐ (Adorufu ni Tsugu)
- Genre: Political thriller
- Manga
- Written by: Osamu Tezuka
- Published by: Bungeishunjū
- English publisher: NA: Vertical, Inc.; Viz Media (former)
- Magazine: Shukan Bunshun
- Original run: January 6, 1983 – May 30, 1985
- Volumes: 5

Message to Adolf (Japanese: アドルフに告ぐ, Hepburn: Adorufu ni Tsugu), known in earlier English translations as Adolf, is a Japanese manga series written and illustrated by Osamu Tezuka. Set before, during, and after World War II, the story is centered on three men who share the name Adolf. Adolf Kamil is an Ashkenazi Jew living in Japan. His best friend Adolf Kaufmann is of both Japanese and German descent. The third Adolf is Adolf Hitler, the dictator of Germany. The manga also features Sohei Toge, a Japanese reporter, and his quest for documents that could turn the tide of the war. The work explores the themes of nationality, ethnicity, racism, and war, and includes elements of coming of age, spy fiction, and historical drama.

Message to Adolf is considered the last completed serialized work of Tezuka's career. Viz Media published the manga as Adolf in English in the 1990s. Vertical, Inc. re-licensed the series and published a new translation in 2012.

== Plot ==
In 1936, Japanese reporter Sohei Toge travels to Berlin to cover the Berlin Olympic Games. Upon arriving, he finds that his younger brother, who has been studying in Germany as an international student, has been murdered and had connections with Communist organisations. Furthermore, all traces of information regarding his younger brother's study in Germany has vanished. Investigating the matter, he later learns that his brother's murder is connected to documents he mailed to Japan with information regarding Adolf Hitler. This information is crucial to the Third Reich as it contains proof that Adolf Hitler has Jewish blood.

Wolfgang Kaufmann, a Nazi Party expatriate living in Japan, is ordered to find the documents. He expects his son, Japanese-German Adolf Kaufmann, to become a staunch supporter of Adolf Hitler and the German Reich. However, Adolf Kaufmann is reluctant to follow his father's wishes, as his best friend Adolf Kamil is the son of German Jews. Wolfgang dies after complications regarding a search for the aforementioned document: with his dying breath, he forces Adolf Kaufmann (hereafter referred to as Kaufmann) to go to Germany in order to join the Hitler Youth. While at the Hitler Youth academy, Kaufmann witnesses Kamil's father brought to execution after he comes to Europe to try to bring Jews to Japan through Shanghai. Kaufmann is forced to execute Kamil's father with a pistol as a loyalty test. As Kaufmann becomes more and more indoctrinated, in contrast his mother Yukie becomes more distant from her late husband's German ties. A test to Kaufmann's loyalty to the Reich comes when he falls in love with Eliza, a Jewish girl born in China. He successfully smuggles her out of Germany to his friend Kamil in Japan, but is unable to get her family to go. A year later, Japan invades China and begins the Second Sino-Japanese War, ushering in a period of fevered militarism and nationalism in Japan. During this time, Kamil becomes the confidant of one of his teachers, Ms. Ogi, who is involved in the Japanese anti-war movement.

As events progress, the lives of the three Adolfs intertwine and become more and more tangled as Toge searches for his brother's murderer. After being tortured by the Gestapo, Toge eventually tracks down his brother's girlfriend, who is revealed to be a spy working for her father, Inspector Lampe. He confronts her in anger, and she confesses to reporting Isao to the SS. After a scuffle, he rapes her and leaves for Japan. Shortly afterwards, she commits suicide. In Japan, Toge quickly becomes a target for both the Kenpeitai and the German secret police, who routinely chase him down and beat him in an attempt to find the documents. Despite this, he links up with Ogi, and manages to recover the documents his brother sent to Kobe before he died. The documents change locations many times as Toge is unable to find a job due to his status as a suspect. During one of these pursuits, he makes friends with a Japanese police chief, who accompanies him on a chase to an island where Ogi is keeping the documents. However, a Gestapo team under Lampe, who is seeking revenge for his daughter, tracks him down there. Toge manages to evade Lampe after a heated firefight on the island. Though the chief is killed, a memo he wrote earlier absolves Toge of wrongdoing, and the Japanese police stop chasing him. To avoid further trouble, the documents are passed to Ogi and then to Kamil, who is now living with Eliza. In 1941 with the German invasion of the Soviet Union, Toge decides that the documents would be best in the hands of Honda, an IJN general's son working for the Soviet spy ring under Richard Sorge. Before Honda can send the documents to the Soviets, Sorge is captured and the spy ring collapses. Before Honda is executed by his father after confessing to treason, he manages to bury the documents.

In the years leading up to 1945, Kaufmann ascends the hierarchy of the Nazi Party and completes his indoctrination as a Nazi. He eventually becomes a loyal subordinate of Hitler and a coordinator of death marches as an SS official. In the fallout of the July 20 Plot and Germany on the brink of military defeat under an increasingly unstable Hitler, he is sent to Japan by a surviving Lampe to complete his father Wolfgang's mission. Upon arrival, he is surprised to find his target, Toge, married to his mother. He also meets with Kamil, who he is angered to find has become engaged to Eliza. He later traps Eliza and rapes her, and eventually beats Kamil who comes for revenge. During his alienation of his family and friends in Japan, he is disowned by Yukie, who shortly thereafter suffers brain damage during the Allied air raid of Kobe. Kaufmann's continued investigation eventually leads to the buried documents, which he discovers only after Hitler's death renders his entire mission pointless.

Kaufmann and Kamil later meet during the Israeli-Lebanese conflict in the 1960s, which sees countless atrocities on both sides. Kaufmann, who has joined the Lebanese PLO after being constantly chased down by Israeli Nazi hunters, arrives home one day to see his Muslim wife and daughter murdered by Kamil's division. He begins a vendetta against Kamil, and challenges him to a duel. Kamil arrives and reveals his knowledge of his father's execution, and after a firefight, gains his revenge by gunning down Kaufmann.

In the 1980s, Toge arrives in Israel to visit Kamil's surviving family after he is killed in a terrorist bombing attack. He resolves to write a book called Message to Adolf, recounting the stories of the three Adolfs, and what the concept of "justice" can lead to.

== Characters ==
- Sohei Toge (峠 草平, Tōge Sōhei): A Japanese reporter sent to Germany to cover the 1936 Olympics only to find his younger brother murdered. He then proceeds to investigate who killed his brother and why, leading him into a dangerous web of espionage during World War II. He was born and raised in Niihari, Ibaraki (now Tsuchiura).
- Isao Toge (峠 勲, Tōge Isao): A Japanese international student studying in Germany and a member of the Communist movement in Germany. When his organisation discovers a shocking secret, he is brutally murdered.
- Acetylene Lampe: A member of the Nazi Party and the Far East Chief of German Intelligence who pursues Toge around the world both to get the documents and kill him for revenge.
- Rosa Lampe: Acetylene's daughter and a Gestapo informant. Reports Isao, resulting in his death, and later Sohei which results in his torture. She commits suicide after Sohei rapes her and leaves Germany.
- Nigawa (仁川): A Japanese police chief who takes Toge's side, and lets him stay at his place. He is killed in a shootout with the Gestapo.
- Mieko Nigawa (仁川 三重子, Nigawa Mieko): The chief's daughter, who falls in love with Yoshio. She later moves to run a bar with Okei, after Honda's death.
- Okei (お桂): A widow who wears Yakuza tattoos. She falls in love with Toge and shelters him during a pursuit by the secret police.
- Sachi Honda (本多 サチ, Honda Sachi): A geisha who was secretly working for the Communists. She is murdered by Kaufmann when they were involved in a tryst during the Gestapo's search for the documents.
- Honda (本多): Sachi's brother, an Imperial Army officer. He loves Yukie and pulls favors for her, including guaranteeing Toge which prevents him from being tortured to death in the beginning of the story. He kills himself after his high position in the Army makes war crimes accusations likely.
- Yoshio Honda (本多 芳男, Honda Yoshio): Honda's son. After living in Manchukuo and seeing Japanese oppression firsthand, he becomes part of Sorge's spy network. Yoshio admires his disgraced aunt's motives, and later becomes friends with Toge and Kamil. He falls in love with Mieko, but is killed by his father after revealing that he is a spy. His father conceals his death as a suicide.
- Adolf Kaufmann (アドルフ・カウフマン, Adorufu Kaufuman): A half-Japanese, half-German boy living in Kobe. Though he opposes the Nazis at first, he develops a hatred for the Jews during his stay in Germany and persecutes them fervently, only renouncing these views at the end of his life. He later joins the Sicherheitsdienst, then Gestapo, then the PLO. He is killed by Kamil, in revenge for the murder of his father.
- Wolfgang Kaufmann (ヴォルフガング・カウフマン, Vorufugangu Kaufuman): Adolf Kaufmann's father and a strong follower of Adolf Hitler. He works for the German Consulate General in Kobe.
- Yukie Kaufmann (由季江・カウフマン, Yukie Kaufuman): Wolfgang's wife and mother to Adolf. She is unaware of what her husband is doing for the Nazi Party. She later renounces her German citizenship and marries Toge. Yukie dies of injuries sustained during the Kobe bombings, but births their daughter before passing.
- Adolf Kamil (アドルフ・カミル, Adorufu Kamiru): A Jewish-German boy who considers himself Japanese, and who accidentally learns the secret behind Adolf Hitler's ancestry. He joins Toge's group during the struggle for control of the document, and emigrates to Israel with his wife after the war, joining the Israeli army.
- Noriko Koshiro (小城 典子, Koshiro Noriko): Also known as Ms. Ogi, she is Kamil's elementary school teacher who is later marked as Communist for writing anti-war poems. She helps Kamil hide the documents.
- Eliza Gerd Hymer (エリザ・ゲルトハイマー, Eriza Gerudo Haimā): A Jewish girl born in China who escapes Germany with the help of Kaufmann, but eventually marries Kamil.
- Isaac Kamil: Adolf Kamil's father, a Jewish man who seeks to actively help other Jews around the world. He is murdered by Adolf Kaufmann while in Germany.
- Adolf Hitler: The German dictator himself. Many liberties are taken for the sake of plot, especially concerning his death.
- Richard Sorge: The German communist spy in charge of Soviet espionage in Japan. He plays a prominent role towards the end of the story.

== Publications ==
Adolf was first published in English in the 1990s by Viz Media under their Cadence Books imprint. The five-volume manga was flipped to read left to right in order to conform to Western practice. In 2012, Vertical, Inc. released the manga in a two-volume edition, which is also flipped, under the title Message to Adolf. It features a new translation by Kumar Sivasubramanian. The series has also been published in Brazil by Conrad Editora, in France by Tonkam, in Germany by Carlsen Verlag, in Italy by Hazard, in Spain by Planeta DeAgostini, in the Netherlands by Xtra, and in Poland by Waneko.

=== Volumes ===
Volumes of English translations, in order:

- Adolf: A Tale of the Twentieth Century
- Adolf: An Exile in Japan
- Adolf: The Half-Aryan
- Adolf: Days of Infamy
- Adolf: 1945 and All That Remains

== Awards ==
Adolf won the Kodansha Manga Award in 1986 for general manga.

== See also ==
- List of Osamu Tezuka manga
- Osamu Tezuka's Star System
- History of the Jews in Kobe
