= The Crater (manga) =

Japanese manga

- Cover of The Crater volume 1 from the Osamu Tezuka Manga Complete Works edition

ザ・クレーター (Za Kurētā)
- Manga
- Written by: Osamu Tezuka
- Published by: Akita Shoten
- English publisher: NA: Digital Manga Publishing
- Magazine: Weekly Shōnen Champion
- Original run: August 10, 1969 – April 1, 1970
- Volumes: 3

The Crater (ザ・クレーター, Za Kurētā) is a manga by Osamu Tezuka that began serialization in 1969.

== Plot ==
The Crater is a collection of self-contained short stories that follow a wide range of themes. From horror to mystery to science fiction, each story focuses on different characters in different settings. Some stories have happy endings, while others do not. Each story usually features a boy known as a variation of the first name "Ryuu" (sometimes Ryuuichi, etc.) or by the surname Okuno (and sometimes Okuchin). The boy appears as an American, African-American, and sometimes Japanese; he can be distinguished by his swooping black hair that covers one eye. He is never the same person in each chapter, though, and is more of a character that is an actor, like that seen in Osamu Tezuka's Star System. Osamu Tezuka's caricature of himself also appears repeatedly throughout the series.

In a similar tradition as The Twilight Zone, each story has a kind of message presented to the reader via unique stories. In Episode 2, "The Octagonal Mansion", the character Ryuichi Kuma is undecided over what to do with his life until he discovers an Octagonal Mansion that allows him to start his life all over again. In Episode 8, "The Bell Rings", three people are haunted by their past sins with the tingling of bells that will not let them forget. When it ended, The Crater had a total of 17 episodes.

Finding all 17 episodes however can be a challenge in that there have been at least three different editions printed. "Akita Manga Collection" consists of 2 volumes of only 7 stories each. "Kodansha Complete Works" is 3 volumes of 6 stories each, and "Akita Best Works Anthology" is 2 volumes of 21 stories total. The filler stories in "Kodansha" and "Akita Best" come from unrelated series.

== Characters ==
- Okuchin: (appears in several Episodes)
- Nancy: (appears in the 1st episode)
- Ryuichi Kuma: (appears in the 2nd episode)
- Eisaku Sato: (appears in the 3rd episode)
- Yukari: (appears in the 4th episode)
- Osamu Tezuka as Himself: (appears in the 7th, 11th, and 16th episodes)
- Midori: (appears in the 13th episode)
- Kantaro: (appears in the 14th episode)
- Chikuwana: (appears in the 16th episode)
- William Frost Wily: (appears in the 17th episode)

== Chapters ==
The titles given here are direct translations from the Japanese and may not reflect "official" names given elsewhere.

2 Dramas (二つのドラマ): Two apparently unrelated young men start switching places with each other when they go unconscious. Ultimately, they clash over the love of a woman desperately trying to escape her life in the slums.

8-Sided Mansion (八角形の館): A young man unable to decide what to do with his life is approached by a witch that uses a coin to seal his fate as a manga artist. When his life becomes difficult he uses his one allowed visit to a strange 8-sided building to switch to an alternate reality where he has become a successful boxer. However, after being tricked into throwing a match, he regrets his choice and is literally torn between his two choices.

The Melted Man (溶けた男): A successful Japanese chemist secretly contracted by the U.S. military to develop the ultimate bio-chemical weapon discovers a young student studying in an abandoned university classroom late at night. Finding out that the student isn't registered at the school, the chemist tries to track the boy down only to learn that he'd died a long time ago while also doing chemical weapon research for the military.

Wind Hole (風穴): The main character, whose name is never given, recounts what happened to his friend, Kazuo Sakai. The protagonist is a young man who had challenged Sakai as a race car driver. The two were friends and roommates, but at some point, Sakai buys a female mannequin, which he then names "Yuriko". He obsesses over Yuriko to the point where he keeps her in his car during races. Sakai tries to make the man see that Yuriko is breaking up their friendship, with no effect. Eventually, Sakai takes his friend and Yuriko to Mount Fuji, where they enter the cave system. Here, Sakai tries to talk sense to his friend. Instead, they end up fighting and Yuriko falls into a pit in the caves. The two men subsequently discover that they're lost and spend hours trying to get back out. The man reaches the point of collapse when Sakai finds the exit and carries his friend to a nearby clinic late at night. The next morning, the man recovers and asks to see his dear friend Sakai, who is still standing in the lobby. When a nurse goes to get him, the body collapses in a heap to reveal Yuriko, leaving the man to wonder if instead it had been Sakai that had fallen into the pit.

Aircraft Down (墜落機): A cowardly, inept Japanese air force pilot in an alternate future flees from a dogfight and ends up crashing on an island. Unable to locate the crash site, his commanders declare the boy dead and create a fictionalized story of bravery that has the boy smashing into an enemy air force control tower. Over time, the boy is awarded medals posthumously, given heroic statues in his memory, and written up in school textbooks. All of which is threatened when he finally makes his way back to base some months later. To rectify the situation, his commanders try to send him out on a suicide mission for real.

2-Headed Snake (双頭の蛇): In the 1990s (20-some years from when the story was written), America has become an integrated society with blacks and whites living and working together. However, a white pharmacist, named Kikero, living in Chicago has created a secret society called "soutou no hebi" ("the 2-Headed Snake"). Kikero's developed a reputation for using Soutou no Hebi to quietly assassinate various blacks in the city. Ryuu, a friend of Kikero's son, Arty, has had his own father killed by Soutou no Hebi and in discovering the truth, shows Arty a picture of the head of Soutou no Hebi. Ryuu convinces Arty to run away from home, which sends Kikero into a panic. He goes to the police for help, and instead is accused by his own gang of betraying Soutou no Hebi to the cops, the penalty for which is death. Now orphans, Ryuu and Arty head out of Chicago in search of a better future.

The Three Invaders (三人の侵略者): 3 scouts from an alien invading force land on Earth and disguise themselves as characters from various bad mobster flicks. They take three hostages in a house neighboring the cabin where Tezuka is trying to draw his manga in solitude. Mistaking Tezuka as a scholar, they kill him and absorb his brain in an attempt to learn more about the planet. As a result, they find themselves taking over Tezuka's manga projects while discovering that their hostages are really escapees from a prison in Hokkaido.

The Bell Rang (鈴が鳴った): Three visitors to an onsen suffer flashbacks of unpleasant events hidden in their past when they hear the ringing of a bell. Complaining to the onsen's owner, they're told that it must be just their imaginations. The owner then shows off his prized pet - a boa constrictor that he feeds live animals to. The guests leave in disgust. Later, the onsen owner eventually traps his wife's cat, which he hates, and feeds it to the snake. The ringing of the bell on the cat's collar then haunts the man and he regrets his deed. At the end, Tezuka tells us about a cricket whose chirp sounds like a bell, and which is found at certain onsens.

Snow Man (雪野郎): Two rival skiers meet at a lodge to face each other at a ski race. They're chased by a truck driver that tries to mow them down, and one skier gets trapped on the side of a cliff after falling off while the other goes for help. Later, it is discovered that the truck driver is actually a deer trying to get revenge for having been hit by a truck on the road some time earlier.

Okuchin's Strange Experience (オクチンの奇怪な体験): Okuchin is a student at a local school, advertising that he'll do anything for 100 yen per activity. For the most part, this means filling in for someone else in a fight, with the goal of reaching 300,000 yen (about $1000 USD at the time). He is approached by a strange man that makes him a stranger offer to give him enough money to clear the 300,000 yen. Soon after, the spirit of a young girl, who had died before heaven was ready to accept her, takes over Okuchin's body for 1 month. This causes a problem, since Okuchin can no longer defend himself from everyone he's ever fought with before.

Mask of Tomoe (巴の面): Tomoe is ugly but kind-hearted. Her sister, Fushimi, is beautiful but evil. When Tomoe is chosen for marriage over Fushimi by a young prince, Fushimi tricks the prince into killing her sister. Tomoe's face is cut off her body as a result, and it turns into a mask that then brings disaster and death to whoever is unfortunate enough to come into possession of it. Including Fushimi, and then ultimately Tezuka himself, several hundred years later he is approached by a toy designer that wants dolls made up with Tomoe's likeness.

Kisetsu the Successful (大あたりの季節): A school boy that has uncanny good luck becomes the target of jealousy from the schoolyard bully. The boy's secret gets revealed - he'd discovered a drainage pipe that opens onto the time stream. By constantly going back in time and reliving various events, he's been able to do many Groundhog Day-like miracles. The bully then tries to use the time stream to win the school's prettiest girl for himself, only to find the other boy constantly beating him to the punch.

The Mystery of Brunnen (ブルンネンのナゾ): Every few days, the PE teacher at a remote school leads his students up a mountain road to Brunnen, a small coffee shop at the top, where the beautiful Miss Midori works. One day, one of the students in the group passes out from a fever on the road, is rescued, and taken to the coffee shop. There, the boy learns that Midori is actually a water sprite that has fallen in love with the owner of Brunnen. When Midori's father (a big humanoid fish) discovers Midori's location, he attempts to drag his daughter back to his mountain lake by force. After the resulting battle, the boy wakes up the next morning lying in the road, healed from his fever, but there's no indication that the coffee shop ever existed.

The Purple BEMs (紫のベムたち): A school boy constantly spends his time protecting his mentally-backward younger brother from being bullied by neighborhood children. The only way he's found to keep his little brother amused is to tell him various children's stories. One night, the younger brother is late in returning home, and the hero discovers the boy out in the hills, having been abducted by bug-eyed monsters from space. The BEMs use a brain enhancing helmet to make the boy smarter and turning him into their spy, but all the boy can do is retell his older brother's stories. The hero returns home and starts crafting his tales so that they'll scare the BEMs off the planet.

Okuchin's Great Mysterious Thief (オクチンの大いなる怪盗): Okuchin is a high school student on the verge of dropping out in the belief that he has no past and no future. On his face is a bandage that reads "no past/no future". After being confined to the classroom by his teacher, he is visited by an unknown man that claims to be a great thief who needs Okuchin for his plans. The thief gives Okuchin a pair of glasses that reveals that all humans have tails. These tails represent the life remaining for that person, and when the tail disappears, that person dies. Okuchin's tail is huge. The thief sets out to steal the tail of Jaquelin Onassis, which he believes can be attached to Okuchin to give the boy even more life, but they get caught and the thief is shot while trying to escape. At the last minute, the thief says that he is Okuchin from the future, telling the boy that this adventure has been for his own benefit. Okuchin is hurled back to the classroom, where the bandage on his face falls off.

The Sacrifice (生けにえ): 2000 years ago in what is now Mexico, a young girl is about to be sacrificed to the gods by being beheaded. Not wanting to die, she pleads to be granted a wish. The god that hears her promises her a new life for ten years, but after that she'll still die. She is then propelled into the present, where she washes up on the shore of an island inhabited by one boy. Having lost her memory, she is then befriended by the boy. The two of them get married, and travel to Japan where the boy becomes a successful businessman and she has a child. After the 10 years are up, she disappears from the kitchen of the apartment without a trace and must fulfill her part of the bargain to the local god.

Man in the Crater (クレーターの男): An astronaut exploring the Moon falls into a crater, breaking his back. He watches as his partners leave him behind to return to Earth. Then, instead of dying from a lack of oxygen, he discovers that a strange mist forms on the floor of the crater when the sun goes down. This mist turns him into an immortal mummy. Decades pass and finally a rocket from Earth lands on the Moon, but instead of being welcomed as a scientific marvel, the hero learns that Earth has been ravaged by wars and all that the new astronauts want are sources of uranium to sell back on the planet.

== North American release ==
Kansai Club Publishing, purported to be "an American publishing company specializing in importing and translating Japanese manga from the 1940s to 1970's", had acquired the rights to publish 2,000 Limited Edition copies of the complete collection of The Crater. The official release date for the books had been set at July 5, 2013. This sole project from Kansai Club appears to have been abandoned. Digital Manga Publishing published The Crater as a single omnibus volume as a bonus for their kickstarter of Tezuka's Under the Air in 2017.

== See also ==
- List of Osamu Tezuka manga
- Osamu Tezuka
- Osamu Tezuka's Star System
