= Dr. Thrill =

Japanese manga

スリル博士 (Suriru Hakase)
- Manga
- Written by: Osamu Tezuka
- Published by: Shogakukan
- Magazine: Weekly Shōnen Sunday
- Original run: April 5, 1959 – September 6, 1959
- Volumes: 1

Doctor Thrill (スリル博士, Suriru Hakase) is a manga series written and illustrated by Osamu Tezuka, published in Shogakukan's Weekly Shōnen Sunday from April 5 to September 6, 1959.

== Plot ==
Dr. Thrill and his son Kenta are mystery aficionados who work as amateur detectives. Tezuka started writing stand alone chapters but, at the request of his editors, he later transformed Dr. Trill into a serial mystery.

== Characters ==
- Dr. Thrill – an avid fan of thrillers and detective stories. He works with his son and pet dog.
- Kenta – Dr. Thrill's son who has a keen sense of reason.
- Jip – Dr. Thrill and Kenta's dog whose quick actions come in handy when solving mysteries.
- Melon
- Kabocha
- Mari

== Appearances in other series ==
In the Sankei Newspaper Astro Boy manga series, Astro travels back in time to 1969 and meets Shunsaku Ban's father, a doctor who runs the "Thrill Clinic". Jip the dog also makes a brief cameo appearance in the Astro Boy story "Plant People".
