= Shin Takarajima (manga) =

Japanese manga

- A 2009 reprint of the original cover

新宝島
- Genre: Adventure
- Manga
- Written by: Shichima Sakai
- Illustrated by: Osamu Tezuka
- Published by: Ikuei Shuppan
- English publisher: Digital Manga Guild
- Published: January 30, 1947

Shin Takarajima (Japanese: 新宝島, 新寳島; pronounced [ɕintakaɾadʑima]; lit. 'New Treasure Island') is a Japanese one-shot manga published by Ikuei Shuppan on January 30, 1947. It was written by Shichima Sakai, and illustrated by Osamu Tezuka.

Following the serialization of 1946 Diary of Ma-chan, this manga is considered to be Tezuka's debut long-form work. According to Tezuka, the manga is a hodgepodge of Treasure Island, Robinson Crusoe, and Tarzan.

In 1986, Tezuka remade the manga, as part of Kodansha's Osamu Tezuka Complete Manga Works series. In December 2019, Shin Takarajima was published in English digitally by Digital Manga Guild.

== Plot ==
Pete, a young boy, found a map of a treasure island, amongst the documents of his late father. He then convinces the captain of the ship he is boarding to find the island. However, along the way, the ship gets ambushed by pirates. Boar, leader of the pirates, takes the map away from Pete and the captain, and captives them aboard his ship. When Pete tries to escape with the map, he and the captain get drifted into the sea by a storm. Using driftwood, they form together a raft, and they begin searching for land. In the middle of their drift, they defeat a mythical shark and eat its meat. It is only after forty days that they reach an island.

On the island, Pete and the captain build a shelter and hunt for animals. When they find a waterfall, the captain realizes that the island is the aforementioned treasure island on the map. When Pete tries to cross a river, the pirates capture the captain, yet again, and drown Pete into the river. Fortunately, Pete gets rescued by Baron, a castaway who happens to spot him in danger. However, as soon as he is saved, he gets captured by the native cannibals of the island.

The pirates abandon the captain after they get the map. When they find the treasure chest hidden in a cave, it is revealed that the chest is already empty. It is only after that the pirates notice they are surrounded by lions, who are about to devour them. Meanwhile, Baron saves Pete yet again, this time from the cannibals, and reunites him with the captain. Baron then brings the true treasure chest from under the waterfall, ending the journey of Pete and the captain in finding the treasure.

After getting the treasure, Pete plans to build a large zoo, where animals and children can play together in harmony. Using smoke signals, Pete and the captain manage to get rescued by a passing ship. Baron and the animals also come along to board the ship. Together, they leave behind the island, and bid their farewell.

In the 1986 remake, the treasure island is revealed to be only a dream, created by a stray dog that Pete found, before he set sails into the sea.

== Characters ==
Tezuka has a list of reoccurring characters, called the Star System. Inspired by Hollywood actors, he would reuse the same characters in multiple different stories. Some characters that first appeared in this manga, would later reappear in Tezuka's future works.

Boy Pete (ピート少年, Pito Shōnen)
The protagonist. Pete has short, dark hair, and bead-shaped eyes. He wears a white collared shirt, with a red letter "P" engraved on it, and black shorts. He is brave and cheerful.
Captain (船長さん, Senchō-san)
The first supporting character. The captain is bald, but bears a white mustache. He wears a black marine uniform, with big buttons on it, and white, long pants. He is wise and intelligent.
Pirate Boar (海賊ボアール, Kaizoku Boaru)
The antagonist. Boar has growing facial hair. He wears a tricorn hat, with a Jolly Roger symbol on it, a gold-buttoned black shirt, a belt, and white pants. He is crippled, bearing only one arm and one leg. He is stubborn and greedy.
Baron (バロン, Baron)
The second supporting character. Baron is blonde-haired on the back cover of the manga, but is dark-haired in the manga pages. He only wears a cheetah-patterned loincloth. He is kind and courageous.

== Production ==
The idea to create Shin Takarajima came during a meeting between Sakai and Tezuka. In August 20, 1946, after publishing a large number of yonkoma series for various newspapers, Tezuka joined the Kansai Manga-Man Club. At the time, the club was recently-formed by manga artists Tokio Osaka and Shichima Sakai. During the first meeting of the club, Osaka showed some of Tezuka's unpublished manga to Sakai. Because Sakai was requested by a publisher to work on a long-form manga, he offered Tezuka to work on the project together. Sakai would work on the script, and Tezuka would work on the art. The manga was planned to contain 200 pages and a full-color frontispiece.

Tezuka spent four months, from September to December 1946, working on the draft for Shin Takarajima. By the time Tezuka was finished, he had drawn around 250 pages. Due to restrictions from their publisher, concerning the page limit, Sakai had to cut around 60 pages from the original draft. For the manuscript, Sakai revised the art, the panel layout, and the writing of the draft. Furthermore, due to technological limitations, the original printing plate for Shin Takarajima was not made using photogravure, but by tracing the manuscript by hand onto the printing plate. Tezuka was neither involved nor pleased with any of the circumstances surrounding the production.

== Release ==
=== Original 1947 Version ===
Shin Takarajima had been rereleased several times, since its original release.

Printed by Tracing

1. First edition, published on January 30, retail price 23 yen. Printed by Nippon Offset Co., Ltd.
2. First edition, published on January 30, retail price 25 yen. Printed by Nippon Offset Co., Ltd.
3. First edition, published on April 1, retail price 30 yen. Printed by Godo Paper Factory

Printed by Photogravuring

1. Reprint, published on April 20, retail price 30 yen. Printed by Misumi Printing Co., Ltd.
2. Revised reprint, published on April 20, retail price 30 yen. Printed by Godo Paper Factory
3. Reprint, published on June 1, retail price 30 yen. Printed by Nippon Offset Co., Ltd.
4. Revised edition, published on July 25, retail price 35 yen. Printed by Nippon Offset Co., Ltd.

=== 1986 Remake ===
A remake of Shin Takarajima was published by Kodansha on October 3, 1986. This remake was solely made by Tezuka, without any involvement with Sakai. Unlike the original 1947 version, this remake contains redrawn pages, a slightly different plot, and a brand new ending that features a plot twist.

== Reception and Legacy ==
The impact of my generation encountering Shin Takarajima amidst the ruins of the post-war era is likely something later generations cannot imagine. It was a completely different world—a world that felt as if it were opening up right before our eyes. I believe the magnitude of that shock is something that cannot be simply brushed aside as a mere imitation of Disney or the influence of American comics.

— Hayao Miyazaki

Shin Takarajima has reportedly sold over 400,000 copies. Many people who read the manga were inspired to become manga artists. Among many others, the Fujiko Fujio duo, Shotaro Ishinomori, Tetsuya Chiba, Mikiya Mochizuki, Mitsutoshi Furuya, Kazuo Umezu, Noboru Kawasaki, and Keiji Nakazawa. The pioneers of gekiga manga, Yoshiharu Tsuge, Yoshihiro Tatsumi, Takao Saito, Shoichi Sakurai, and Masaaki Sato, all spoke highly of the manga.

In the February 27, 1989 issue of CoroCoro Comic, Hiroshi Fujimoto recalled his astonishment when he first encountered the manga, as a junior high school student. He thought it was different, and that "it was unlike any manga we had seen up until then." In the book We've Only Drawn Boys' Manga Together, Mooto Abiko also recalled his experience in encountering the manga, being impressed by the cinematic nature of the first two pages. "Looking back now, I realized that when I got this book in my hands, my fate was sealed."

Despite positive reception from young readers, Shin Takarajima was heavily criticized by veteran manga artists in Tokyo, at the time it was first published. When Tezuka showed the manga to Kennosuke Niizeki, he suggested Tezuka to formally study art, based on the fact that Tezuka was a self-taught artist. Keizo Shimada found the manga to be unusual, and worried that other artists would adopt its style in less effective ways. Fukujiro Yokoi thought that the manga was a "cheap trick," and that it needed "parody and irony. And lots of powerful satire of the real world, too." Yokoi clarified that the reason he was blunt with his criticisms was because he had heard that Tezuka was talented.

The impact went beyond manga. Before becoming a successful science fiction novelist, Sakyo Komatsu was originally a manga artist, inspired by Shin Takarajima. Other notable people influenced by the work include Tadanori Yokoo, Makoto Wada, Genpei Akasegawa and Taku Mayumura.

In 2025, Naoki Urasawa opined that there were two big impacts in the history of manga; the first was the 1947 publication of Shin Takarajima, and the second was Katsuhiro Otomo's Domu in 1980.

== Research ==
Historian Ryan Holmberg noted visual and thematic parallels between the manga and the 1942 Disney comic Donald Duck Finds Pirate Gold. Comic scholar Eike Exner argued that the sales number of the manga could have been exaggerated, considering that the best-selling Norakuro tankōbon, the most popular manga series in 1940s Japan, only sold around 134,000 copies.
