= Apollo's Song =

Japanese manga

- The cover of Apollo's Song

アポロの歌 (Apollo no Uta)
- Genre: Science fiction
- Manga
- Written by: Osamu Tezuka
- Published by: Shōnen Gahōsha
- English publisher: NA: Vertical, Inc.
- Magazine: Weekly Shōnen King
- Original run: April 26, 1970 – November 22, 1970
- Volumes: 1

Apollo's Song (Japanese: アポロの歌, Hepburn: Aporo no Uta) is a manga written and illustrated by Osamu Tezuka. It was originally serialized in Weekly Shōnen King in Japan in 1970 and was published in English translation in 2007.

The story follows a neglected and abused boy, Shogo, who does not have any feelings of love. Through a series of visions spanning the past and future, Shogo explores the meaning of love between man and woman. Tezuka describes love and death as a cycle that men and women must endure and repeat until the end of time.

== Plot ==
Shogo Chikaishi (近石昭吾) is a boy whose single mother never knew his father, as he was born after a series of affairs. An unintended child, he was beaten by his mother whenever he witnessed love and tenderness. This led to Shogo killing various animals upon seeing their love. Because of this, Shogo is taken to a mental institute. After an shock therapy, Shogo has an out-of-body experience, and he meets the Greek goddess of wisdom Athena, who subjugates him to experience love across different periods for the rest of eternity, dying repeatedly until he can one day understand the true meaning of love.

In his first experience, Shogo is in Nazi Germany as a German stormtrooper, where he falls in love with the Jewish woman named Elise. Shogo helps her to escape, but she shoots him when she discovers that her parents have been killed. Succumbing to his wound, Shogo shoots and kills the soldiers who beat Elise. They then die side by side as they declare their love for one another, but the next morning, a search party eventually finds the dead soldiers and Elise, carrying her away from a dying Shogo. When he wakes up at the clinic, Shogo is hypnotized and has a vision of an idyllic island he inhabits with a photographer named Naomi after their plane crashes, and they get stranded on the island filled with pairs of animals. After some time, Shogo and Naomi see a ship in the distance that comes to help any inhabitants on the island. Shogo asks them to take the animals, but the Crewmen, not wanting to care for the animals, begin shooting them as conflict with the animals ensues, and Naomi is killed by a stray bullet, leaving Shogo and the animals to perish after the believed-to-be-dormant volcano erupts.

Back in the real world, Shogo is accused of murdering a nymphomaniac patient and escapes the institute. His speed running from the police is witnessed by Hiromi Watari (渡ひろみ), so she takes him to train to be a marathon runner. While he is training alone, Hiromi's former fiancé appears and pushes Shogo down a cliff, and he apparently dies but is rescued by Hiromi. Unconscious, Shogo has a vision of a dystopian future in which humans are subjugated by a race of clones called Synthians. He is sent to assassinate the ruler of the Synthians, Queen Sigma, who physically resembles Hiromi but falls for her instead. Gradually, the queen begins to love him too, but after several mishaps involving her clones, Shogo is killed by a clone of himself created by Prime Minister Bibimba, the general of the Synthians who resembles Hiromi's fiancé.

Upon returning to the real world, he witnessed a double suicide by a couple whose love was not permitted by their families. When he discovers Hiromi is a physician who is trying to "cure" him, Shogo tries to commit suicide, but Hiromi stops him, falling over the edge. Shogo rescues Hiromi, and as they acknowledge their love for one another, she dies in his arms. The police, along with the institute's doctor, find Shogo and attempt to inform him that the nymphomaniac's death was her own fault. However, Shogo tells the doctor that he finally knows what love is and that life is nothing but meaningless without Hiromi. Shogo dumps Hiromi's body in a canister of oil and provokes the police to shoot him, causing the canister to explode and kill him instantly. After this, Shogo is brought back before Athena, who tells him that he must continue to endure pain and suffering whenever he finds love for the rest of eternity. As Shogo leaves, Hiromi is resurrected and follows him.

== Production ==
Sex education for children was taboo in Japan in the late 1960s, but this changed suddenly in the early 1970s. Apollo's Song was created during a period when manga was increasingly portraying sexual stories and imagery, and was Tezuka's exploration of love and sex in manga form. This period in Japan was also marked by violent student riots and incidents involving student activists, and Tezuka reportedly later said that Shogo's depressed character reflected the dark mood and instability in society at the time.
