= Diary of Ma-chan =

Japanese manga

- Diary of Mā-chan
- Cover of Diary of Mā-chan from the Osamu Tezuka Manga Complete Works edition.

マアチャンの日記帳 (Maachan no Nikkichō)
- Genre: Slice of life story
- Manga
- Written by: Osamu Tezuka
- Published by: Mainichi Shimbun
- Magazine: Shokokumin Shinbun (Mainichi elementary school children's newspaper)
- Original run: January 4, 1946 – March 31, 1946
- Volumes: 1

Diary of Mā-chan (マアチャンの日記帳, Maachan no Nikkichō) is a manga by Osamu Tezuka that began serialization in 1946.

== Plot ==
Diary of Mā-chan is a collection of 4-panel comic strips (yonkoma) about the everyday adventures of a small pre-school boy named Mā-chan. The manga consists of 73 strips.

== Characters ==
- Mā-chan: A mischievous little pre-school boy growing up immediately after World War II.
- Ton-chan: Ma-chan's friend.
- University-age boy
- Father: Ma-chan's father.
- Mother: Ma-chan's mother.
- Teacher: Ma-chan's pre-school teacher.

== First work by Tezuka ==
Diary of Mā-chan was Tezuka's first professional work to be published. When Tezuka drew it in 1945, he was only 17 years old. While the drawings were crude compared to his later art work, many elements of his art style first became visible in this comic strip. Diary of Mā-chan was so popular that Mā-chan dolls were produced, the first of many Tezuka merchandise products.

== See also ==
- List of Osamu Tezuka manga
- Osamu Tezuka's Star System
