= Biiko-chan =

Japanese manga series

- Cover of volume 1 of the picture book.

びいこちゃん

Biiko-chan (びいこちゃん) is a three volume manga picture book series created in 1957 by Osamu Tezuka for second year elementary school students. The series won the 3rd Shogakukan Manga Award in 1957.

== Titles ==
- Biiko to Yūgatō (びいことゆうがとう)
- Biiko-chan (びいこちゃん)
- Oshare na Biiko (おしゃれなびいこ)
