= Swallowing the Earth =

Japanese manga series

- The cover of the first volume of Swallowing the Earth.

地球を呑む (Chikyū o Nomu)
- Genre: Action, mystery, sci-fi
- Manga
- Written by: Osamu Tezuka
- Published by: Shogakukan
- English publisher: Digital Manga
- Magazine: Big Comic
- Original run: April 1968 – 25 July 1969
- Volumes: 2

Swallowing the Earth (地球を呑む, Chikyū o Nomu) is a manga by Osamu Tezuka serialized in Big Comic and licensed by Digital Manga.

== Characters ==
- Gohonmatsu Seki (関五本松, Seki Gohonmatsu)
- Milda (ミルダ)
- Zephyrus (ゼフィルス)
- Monte Chritos (モンテ・クリスト)
- Kitaro Adachigahara (安達原 鬼太郎, Adachigahara Kitarō)
