= Ayako (manga) =

Japanese manga series

- Cover of Ayako Vol. 1 from the Osamu Tezuka Manga Complete Works edition.

奇子
- Genre: Drama
- Manga
- Written by: Osamu Tezuka
- Published by: Shogakukan
- English publisher: NA: Vertical
- Magazine: Big Comic
- Original run: January 25, 1972 – June 25, 1973
- Volumes: 3

Ayako (奇子) is a manga trilogy by Osamu Tezuka. It was serialized in Big Comic, a manga magazine published by Shogakukan. It is licensed in North America by Vertical. It is also licensed in France by Delcourt/Akata, in Italy by Hazard Edizioni, and in Brazil by Veneta.

The story is about a post-World War II Japanese landlord family, the Tenge (天外), who have to cope with economic and family tensions while the country is under reconstruction.

== Plot ==
Jiro Tenge (天外仁朗, Tenge Jirō), one of the eldest sons of the moderately wealthy Tenge family, has become an agent working for the United States, and his secret murders are discovered by Ayako Tenge (天外奇子, Tenge Ayako), his youngest sister. This problem is aggravated by her discovery of terrible incestuous affairs in her own family: the wife of her older brother (foster son of Sakuemon Tenge) is actually her mother, who has to frequently have sex with Ayako's father, the family patriarch Sakuemon. To hide these secrets, the family—under pressure from Sakuemon and his eldest son Ichiro—decides to keep Ayako locked up in the basement for the rest of her life.

Despite the efforts of her mother and younger brother Shiro, she lives for nearly two dozen years under the family's house, while great political and social changes occur above her. Ayako eventually leaves the basement after growing into a beautiful and attractive woman, and seeks affection from others while remaining terrified of the outside world. This sets off a chain reaction of events which spells tragedy for the Tenge family.

== See also ==
- Osamu Tezuka
- List of Osamu Tezuka manga
- Osamu Tezuka's Star System
- National Railway Workers' Union
- Shimoyama incident
