= Eiichi Fukui =

Japanese manga artist

- 福井英一
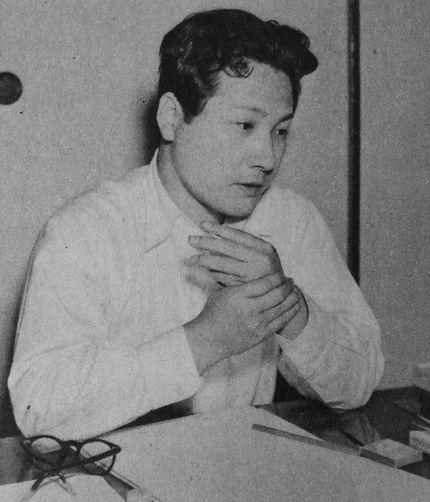
- Eiichi in 1953
- Born: March 3, 1921; Tokyo Prefecture, Japan
- Died: June 26, 1954 (aged 33); Tokyo, Japan
- Occupation: Manga artist
- Years active: 1949–1954
- Known for: Igaguri-kun

Eiichi Fukui (福井英一, March 3, 1921 – June 26, 1954) was a Japanese manga artist.

== Life ==
Fukui graduated from middle school in 1938 and then began working in the animation industry. During World War II, he worked for Nippon Eiga sha, which produced propaganda cartoons. In 1945 he was hired by another animation studio, Shin Nihon Dōga sha, and also worked for Nihon Manga Eiga sha, where he worked for Mitsuyo Seo as a chief animator until 1949. After the collapse of the studio, he began publishing manga.

His first work was to take over the baseball manga series Bat Kid in 1949 for the magazine Manga Shōnen, after its creator Kazuo Inoue had died. His most popular series was Igaguri-kun, about an orphaned boy who becomes a strong judo fighter. It ran from 1952 to 1954 in Bōken Ō and was at the time the industry's top-selling manga series. The success of the manga led to a strong increase in sales of the magazine it was published in and also paved the way for more manga centering judo. Its cinematic narration, influenced by Osamu Tezuka's story manga, and fight scenes had an impact on the development of sports manga.

Osamu Tezuka criticized the breakdown-oriented drawing style of Fukui and other popular artists at the time in his 1953 series Manga Classroom: "Truth be told, at the time I was extremely jealous of Fukui's drawing. That ended up bleeding unconsciously into Manga Classroom in the form of slander against an Igaguri kun-like manga."

He also created Akado Suzunosuke, which was published in the August 1954 issue of Shōnen Gaho.

Fukui died suddenly at the age of 33 of karōshi, overworking, while being pressured to draw the closing of the works for a supplement for Bōken Ō magazine and having drunken a lot of alcohol. Fukui's death led other manga artists to protest against the low pay for magazine supplements and publishers agreed to raise the salary for these.
