= Ambassador Atom =

Japanese manga series

- A color cover page of Ambassador Atom

アトム大使 (Atomu Taishi)
- Genre: Adventure, science fiction, humor
- Manga
- Written by: Osamu Tezuka
- Magazine: Shōnen
- Original run: April 1951 – March 1952

Ambassador Atom (アトム大使, Atomu Taishi) is a manga short series written by Osamu Tezuka. It was originally serialized in Kobunsha's Shōnen magazine from 1951 to 1952. The series is mostly noted for introducing the character Astro Boy. The series would be released as Chapter 0 in the original Astro Boy tankōbon volumes published by Kodansha.
