= Ludwig B =

Unfinished Japanese manga series by Osamu Tezuka

- Cover art by Tezuka

ルードヴィヒ・B (Rudovihi B)
- Genre: Biography
- Manga
- Written by: Osamu Tezuka
- Published by: Ushio Shuppan
- Original run: 1987 – 1989
- Volumes: 2

Ludwig B (Japanese: ルードヴィヒ・B, Hepburn: Rudovihi B) is a Japanese manga series written and illustrated by Osamu Tezuka as a biographical adaptation of the early life of the composer Ludwig van Beethoven. The manga focuses on Beethoven's struggles and passions as a youth, including the deterioration of his hearing, his relationship with his abusive, alcoholic father, and his self-expression through music. The manga began in June 1987 with intentions to encompass the entire artistic path of Beethoven until his maturity, but was interrupted by Tezuka's death in 1989. After Tezuka's death, the manga was left unfinished and published only in Japanese until a Kickstarter campaign funded its translation into English.

== Plot ==
The story begins in Vienna with the birth of Franz Kreuzstein, a young man who avows to hate anyone named "Ludwig" since the screech of a peacock of the same name caused the death of his mother. In 1770, Ludwig van Beethoven is born in Bonn, Germany. Young Beethoven is relentlessly pushed by his father to practice the piano in order to secure a rich aristocrat to serve as the family's benefactor. Six-year-old Beethoven receives renown while his father spirals into alcoholism. While in Bonn, young Ludwig and Franz Kreuzstein cross paths, resulting in Franz flying into a rage and striking Ludwig in the ear, causing the boy's deafness.

Undaunted, Ludwig strives to continue excelling in his musical studies, leading him to a short tutelage under an older Wolfgang Amadeus Mozart before returning home. Ludwig presses on in honing his talents regardless of the many setbacks around him, including his father's alcoholism, a fling with a beautiful aristocratic lady, and the French Revolutionary Wars. After securing a mentorship under famous composer Joseph Haydn, Ludwig strives on toward musical greatness.

== Production ==
With the success of the ten-year project Buddha, Tezuka became inspired to write an epic biographical work based on Beethoven. After the Japanese Ministry of Foreign Affairs sent him to a conference in Nancy, France, Tezuka took the opportunity to visit other parts of Europe. During his trip, he visited Vienna and went to many memorial sites dedicated to Beethoven, including his old room where Tezuka touched the composer's own piano.
