= Ode to Kirihito =

Japanese manga series

- Cover art from Osamu Tezuka's book Ode to Kirihito, published by Shogakukan.

きりひと讃歌 (Kirihito Sanka)
- Genre: Horror
- Manga
- Written by: Osamu Tezuka
- Published by: Shogakukan
- English publisher: NA: Vertical Inc.
- Magazine: Big Comic
- Original run: 1970 – 1971
- Volumes: 4

Ode to Kirihito (きりひと讃歌, Kirihito Sanka) is a Japanese manga series by Osamu Tezuka. It was originally serialized in Big Comic in Japan from 1970 to 1971 and was published in English translation in 2006 by Vertical Inc.

This series is about a heroic young doctor named Kirihito Osanai and his efforts to cure a strange disease that deforms its victims so that they look like dog-people. He becomes infected with the disease himself and is led on a wild odyssey around the world as he is kidnapped and maltreated by the ignorant and the curious, meeting strange allies and stranger foes.

== Plot ==
The intractable disease known as Monmow, whose cases are found only in the village of Inugamisawa ('Doggoddale' in the English translation) in the mountains of Tokushima prefecture, makes the bones of the whole body shrink and enlarge at the ends at the same time, changing the sufferer into a form like that of a dog, and ultimately causes death. Dr. Tatsugaura of M University Hospital plans to publish his theory that Monmow is a virus and to win the chair as president of the medical society (or JMA, 'Japanese Medical Association') by the strength of that theory. Kirihito Osanai, an intern at M University Hospital, who with his passionate nature is generally liked, is a member of the Young Doctors' Association and is unknowingly disliked by Tatsugaura for that reason. He is ordered to do an on-site study of the disease, and despite the wish of his fiancée Izumi, goes to Doggodale.

Everything proceeds as Tatsugaura has arranged. Osanai is confined within the village and marries a village girl named Tazu and by marrying her Osanai is safe from the wrath of the village, and is accepted by a majority of them. Osanai subsequently contracts Monmow. Even Izumi, who has come to search for him, cannot find any clue about his whereabouts. Meanwhile, Osanai's name is deleted from the register of the doctors at the M University under Tatsugaura's order. Osanai, assisted by Tazu who loves him for who he is, finds out that the cause of the Monmow is related to an old stratum that has dissolved into the river water, succeeds in overcoming the symptoms of the disease.

Later Tazu is murdered by a rapist, and despite still obtaining a dog's face and body hair, Osanai embarks upon a quest of self-discovery, promising he would avenge her eventually. He crosses the ocean to Taiwan, and then to Syria, roaming with no destination. Along the way he endures many hardships including the loss of Reika, a circus performer who helped him escape from a sadistic Taiwanese millionaire.

Meanwhile, Tatsugaura's scheme is steadily realized in Japan. Urabe, a colleague of Osanai, brings back Sister Helen of a South African convent who contracts Monmow. Urabe explains that Helen had drunk contaminated water and this relates to Osanai's theory that Monmow is endemic. He shows her in the medical conference where Tatsugaura makes a presentation. On the day of the election of the president of the JMA, Osanai appears at the site of voting, and reveals Tatsugaura's plan all along. Tatsugaura wins the election despite Osanai's revelation, but falls ill with Monmow. Rejecting various evidences proving that Monmow is not caused by a virus, Tatsugaura slips into a coma and dies. Helen also gives birth to Urabe's healthy, non-deformed baby. The story ends with Osanai (still in his dog-like form) returning to Syria, following a promise that he made to an Arab village he assisted. Izumi decides to follow him, and their future is left open-ended to the reader.

== Release ==
The first Vertical Inc. edition of Ode to Kirihito is notable for having an unusual cover design by Chip Kidd which features a slider that, when moved to the left, reveals Kirihito's face after he has contracted Monmow's disease (Vertical has since republished Ode to Kirihito in two separate volumes with no slider).
