= MW (manga) =

Manga series by Osama Tezuka

- Cover of the first edition of MW

ムウ (Muu)
- Genre: Suspense
- Manga
- Written by: Osamu Tezuka
- Published by: Shogakukan
- English publisher: NA: Vertical
- Magazine: Big Comic
- Original run: 1976 – 1978
- Volumes: 3
- Films
- MW (film)

MW (Japanese: ムウ, Hepburn: Muu; pronounced "Moo") is a manga series by Osamu Tezuka. It was originally serialized in Shogakukan's Big Comic in Japan, from 1976 to 1978, and was published in English translation by Vertical Inc. in 2007. Vertical's edition earned it a nomination for Eisner Award at the category "Best U.S. Edition of International Material—Japan", but it lost to Tekkonkinkreet. A Japanese film adaptation was released in July 2009. A thriller, MW follows a fictional Japanese priest, Father Garai, his lifelong connection to serial killer Michio Yuki, and a mysterious chemical weapon "MW" developed by the occupying American Force in Japan.

This manga series is notable because it can be seen as Tezuka's response to the gekiga ("dramatic pictures") artists who emerged in the 1960s and 70s, and as an attempt to surpass their work. The gekiga artists of this period created gritty, adult-oriented works that sharply contrasted to the softer, Disney-influenced style with which Tezuka was associated, a style that was seen as being out-of-step with the times. Also of note are the explicit homosexual relationships in the manga.

== Plot ==
The banker Michio Yuki (結城美知夫) leads a double life. Besides his dayjob, he also engages in a series of kidnappings in which he usually will kill both the kidnapped person as well as the extorted victim, after he has reaped the ransom money. After his deeds, he seeks refuge with the Catholic priest Father Garai (賀来巌). The two men share a history, as 15 years prior, they were both the only survivors of a leak of poisonous gas at a military base on a small Pacific island near Okinawa, known as Okino Mafune Island. The men also share a homosexual relationship; after their first night together, the adolescent Garai raped the then-underaged Michio. However, Michio did not escape unscathed, as he inhaled a dose of the poisonous gas, MW, which drove him criminally insane, but the incident had been carefully covered up and the island repopulated, while the military base was dissolved and the MW moved to another base.

Garai, feeling that Michio's misdeeds are in part his responsibility and also bound to his oath as a priest, chooses not to hand Michio over to the police but instead to assist him in his escape.

After tormenting his boss by murdering his daughter and robbing the bank, he works at impersonating his daughter. While simultaneously organizing funds for the boss' political party, Michio gains political influence and access to Eikaku Nakata, a politician whose re-election campaign his boss was supposed to manage. After taking over this job, Michio kills his boss on the night of Nakata's re-election. His boss had turned out to have been an assistant at the Okino Mafune Island townhall, who was away on the mainland at the time of the MW incident, while Nakata is revealed to have been the assemblyman who had coordinated the cover-up.

For his next step Michio, with the help of a leftist extremist group and Garai, kidnaps Taizo Yubashito, the CEO of a construction company, who had been tasked with the reconstruction of Okino Mafune Island and the relocation of the MW, which had been split into two amounts. One half of the MW had been transported to another military base, while the other half was brought to another hideout on the island. Michio and Garai bring Yubashito to Okino Mafune Island, and after Michio tortures him severely, Yubashito tells them that the MW is kept in a mass tomb. Upon their arrival at the tomb, they are ambushed by a military chopper. Yubashito is killed in the attack. Garai enters the tomb, only to find the containers are empty.

During the return to the mainland, Michio tells Garai that his intent is not revenge, but to mass-produce the MW and exterminate humanity. He formed this resolution due to long-term effects of the gas-poisoning taking their toll on Michio's body. Garai is disgusted by the plan, and resolves to stop Michio. He contacts a newspaper reporter, who then writes a story about the Okino Mafune Island incident. The article incites public outrage. In his investigation, the reporter also uncovered that the rest of the MW had been transported to a military base near Tokyo.

Michio, on the other hand, during his honeymoon with Mr. Nakata's daughter, breaks a safe-cracker out of jail. Upon his return, and after murdering his wife and desecrating her body, he enters the Tokyo military base with the safe-cracker, thanks to the help of an unsuspecting Lieutenant General Minch and his wife, with both of whom Michio has sexual relations. The two torture Minch to give up the location of the MW, and proceed towards the vault. Garai, who also made his way to the base, is on their heels. A third party, that includes a public prosecutor named Meguro, who investigated the case starting with the serial abductions, is also after Michio. Finally, the military has noticed that General Minch has gone missing, and they put the base on alert.

After he enters the vault, Michio fills a bag with some MW gas. After a series of cunning moves and threats of releasing the MW from the bag, he makes his way to Minch's private jet. He boards the jet with Garai, Minch and two children of another military officer. While engaging in another liaison with Garai, Michio gives the bag to the children, telling them not to open it unless someone besides him tries to take it from them.

However, the party has to make a stop at Tokyo Airport, to switch to another plane. Prosecutor Meguro takes advantage of this and places Michio's brother, who shares a striking resemblance with Michio, on the original plane while able to chase Michio and his party back onto it where Michio forces Minch to take off again. Michio's brother is able to exchange the bag, which the children are guarding, with an identical bag filled with air. Michio discovers this and a fist-fight breaks out. Michio gets hold of a bag and releases the valve, only to find out it's the air-filled bag. Garai grabs the bag filled with MW and jumps out of the plane into the ocean and drowns. Minch shoots Michio.

The plane returns to Tokyo, where the case is discussed in the Japanese Diet. Mr. Nakata, however, is not in this discussion, as he suffered a cerebral softening after he learned about the demise of his daughter as well as the disfigurement and dismemberment of her body. The book closes with Michio's brother grinning at the reader, which raises the question of whether this is Michio's brother or in fact Michio himself.
