= Osamu Tezuka =

Japanese cartoonist and animator (1928–1989)

- 手塚 治虫
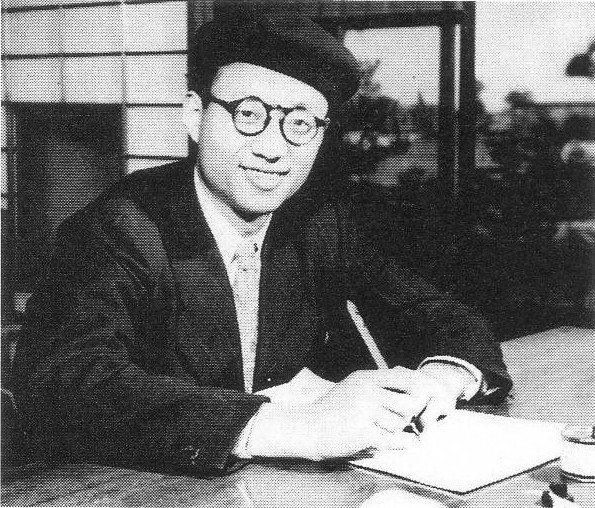
- Tezuka in 1951
- Born: 3 November 1928; Toyonaka, Osaka Prefecture, Japan
- Died: 9 February 1989 (aged 60); Tokyo, Japan
- Education: Osaka Imperial University; Nara Medical University (M.D., 1961)
- Occupations: Manga artist; cartoonist; animator
- Years active: 1946–1989
- Organizations: Mushi Production; Tezuka Productions
- Notable work: Astro Boy; Kimba the White Lion; Princess Knight; Phoenix; Dororo; Animerama; Buddha; Black Jack
- Spouse: Etsuko Okada (m. 1959–1989)
- Children: 2, including Makoto

Japanese name
- Kanji: 手塚 治虫
Transcriptions
- Romanization: Tezuka Osamu

Osamu Tezuka (手塚 治虫, born 手塚 治, Tezuka Osamu, 3 November 1928 – 9 February 1989) was a Japanese manga artist, cartoonist and animator. Considered to be among the greatest and most influential cartoonists of all time, his prolific output, pioneering techniques and innovative redefinitions of genres earned him such titles as "the Father of Manga" (マンガの父, Manga no Chichi), "the Godfather of Manga" (マンガの教父, Manga no Kyōfu) and "the God of Manga" (マンガの神様, Manga no Kami-sama). Additionally, he is often considered the Japanese equivalent to Walt Disney, who served as a major inspiration during Tezuka's formative years. Though this phrase praises the quality of his early manga works for children and animations, it also blurs the significant influence of his later, more literary, gekiga works.

Inspired by the early Chinese animated film Princess Iron Fan, Tezuka began what was known as the manga revolution in Japan with his New Treasure Island published in 1947. His output would spawn some of the most influential, successful and well-received manga series including the children's manga Astro Boy, Princess Knight and Kimba the White Lion, and the adult-oriented series Black Jack, Phoenix and Buddha, all of which won several awards.

Tezuka died of stomach cancer in 1989. His death had an immediate impact on the Japanese public and other cartoonists. A museum was constructed in Takarazuka dedicated to his memory and life works, and Tezuka received many posthumous awards. Several animations were in production at the time of his death along with the final chapters of Phoenix, which were never released.

== Biography ==
=== Early life (1928–1945) ===
Tezuka was born in Toyonaka, Osaka. He was the eldest of three children. The Tezuka family were prosperous and well-educated; his father Yutaka worked in management at Sumitomo Metals, his grandfather Taro was a lawyer and his great-grandfather Ryoan and great-great-grandfather Ryosen were doctors. His mother's family had a long military history.

Later in life, he gave his mother credit for inspiring confidence and creativity through her stories. She frequently took him to the Takarazuka Grand Theater, which often headlined the Takarazuka Revue, an all-female musical theater troupe. Their romantic musicals aimed at a female audience, had a large influence of Tezuka's later works, including his costume designs. Not only that, but the performers' large, sparkling eyes also had an influence on Tezuka's art style. He said that he had a profound "spirit of nostalgia" for Takarazuka.

When Tezuka was young, his father showed him Walt Disney films and he became a Disney movie buff, seeing the films multiple times in a row, most famously seeing Bambi more than 80 times. Tezuka started to draw comics around his second year of elementary school, in large part inspired by Disney animation; he drew so much that his mother would have to erase pages in his notebook in order to keep up with his output. Tezuka was also inspired by the works by Suihō Tagawa and Unno Juza. Later in life, he would state that the most important influence on his desire to be an animator was not Disney but the experience of watching the Chinese animation Princess Iron Fan as a child.

Around his fifth school year, he found a description of a ground beetle, known as "Osamushi" in Japanese, in a book on insects. Its name so resembled his own name that he adopted "Osamushi" as his pen name. Tezuka continued to develop his manga skills throughout his school career. During this period he created his first adept amateur works.

During high school in 1944, Tezuka was drafted to work for a factory, supporting the Japanese war effort during World War II; he simultaneously continued writing manga. In 1945, Tezuka was accepted into Osaka University and began studying medicine. During this time, he also began publishing his first professional works.

=== Early success (1946–1951) ===
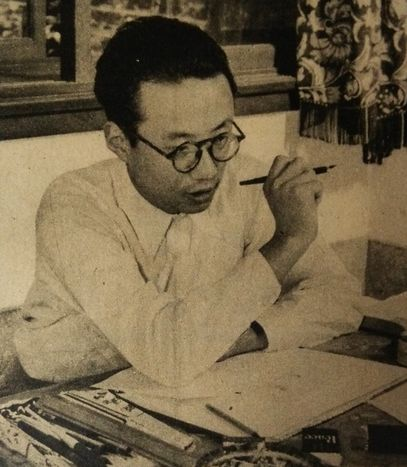
Tezuka in the 1950s

Tezuka came to the realization that he could use manga as a means of helping to convince people to care for the world. After World War II, at age 17, he published his first professional work, Diary of Ma-chan, which was serialized in the elementary school children's newspaper Shokokumin Shinbun in early 1946.

Tezuka began talks with fellow manga creator Shichima Sakai, who pitched Tezuka a story based on Robert Louis Stevenson's classic adventure novel, Treasure Island. Sakai promised Tezuka a publishing spot from Ikuei Shuppan(育英出版) if he would work on the manga. Tezuka finished the manga, only loosely basing it on the original work. Shin Takarajima (New Treasure Island) was published and became an overnight success, which began the golden age of manga, a craze comparable to American comic book Golden Age at the same time.

With the success of New Treasure Island, Tezuka traveled to Tokyo in search of a publisher for more of his work. Kobunsha turned Tezuka down, but Shinseikaku agreed to publish The Strange Voyage of Dr. Tiger and Domei Shuppansha agreed to publish The Mysterious Dr. Koronko.

While still in medical school Tezuka published his first masterpieces: a trilogy of science fiction epics called Lost World (1948), Metropolis (1949), and Nextworld (1951).

Tezuka played a central role in the influential magazine Manga Shōnen, which was published between 1947 and 1955, contributing some of its most influential works and helping to define its artistic and pedagogical vision. His serial Kimba the White Lion (1950–1954) was the magazine's most popular feature, demonstrating the potential of manga to deliver emotional, cinematic storytelling with moral depth. Tezuka also wrote the instructional column Manga Classroom (1952–1954), which encouraged young readers to see manga as a learnable craft, inspiring many aspiring artists. His involvement was not only instrumental in elevating the magazine's prestige but also deeply formative for his own development; Manga Shōnen provided him a platform to experiment with narrative form and to mentor a new generation of artists.

In 1951, Tezuka graduated from the Osaka School of Medicine and published Ambassador Atom, the first appearance of the Astro Boy character. That same year Tezuka joined a group known as the Tokyo Children Manga Association, consisting of other manga artists such as Baba Noboru, Ota Jiro, Furusawa Hideo, Eiichi Fukui, Irie Shigeru and Negishi Komichi.

=== Astro Boy, national fame and early animation (1952–1960) ===
By 1952, Ambassador Atom had proven to be an only mild success in Japan; however, one particular character became extremely popular with young boys: a humanoid robot named Atom. Tezuka received several letters from many young boys. Expecting success with a series based around Atom, Tezuka's producer suggested that he be given human emotions. One day, while working at a hospital, Tezuka was punched in the face by a frustrated American G.I. This encounter gave Tezuka the idea to include the theme of Atom's interaction with aliens. On 4 February 1952, Tetsuwan Atom began serialization in Shonen (Magazine). The character Atom and his adventures became an instant phenomenon in Japan.

Due to the success of Tetsuwan Atom, in 1953, Tezuka published the shōjo manga Ribon no Kishi (Princess Knight), serialized in Shojo Club from 1953 to 1956.

In 1954, Tezuka first published what he would consider his life's work, Phoenix, which originally appeared in Mushi Production Commercial Firm. Tezuka moved house in 1954, offering his Tokiwa-sō apartment to two budding manga artists he had complemented previously, Hiroshi Fujimoto and Motoo Abiko. The duo, collectively known as Fujiko Fujio, would later form careers rivaling Tezuka's in popularity and ambitions, passing on the apartment to other manga artists as time went on.

=== Production career (1959–1989) ===
Tezuka's first work to be adapted for animation was Saiyuki, a retelling of the Chinese story of Journey to the West. Produced by Toei Animation, Tezuka was officially credited as the director of the film. However, later crew accounts would prove that the manga artist was difficult to motivate to do work. Most of the direction was done by Yabushita Taiji instead. Tezuka was eventually given the task of storyboarding the film, so that he didn't actually have to animate anything and something in the production could get done. He did not follow Toei's deadlines, and after a year of working on the project and several weeks of threats from Toei's producers, he finally delivered his 500-page storyboard so the animators could do their job in the autumn of 1959. That said, the crew found the storyboard to be entirely unpractical, lacking pacing and a clear plot for a 90-minute film, instead something that would be better told through an open-ended weekly comic like what Tezuka had been producing. This ran counter to Toei's "climax method" that had the goal of a big finish at the end for audiences to leave the cinema remembering. The script for the film was credited to Uekusa Keinosuke. The film was released as Alakazam the Great in 1960.

That said, many of the animators were initially shocked at the amount they had to produce in such a short amount of time—amounting to a frame a day, thinking it undoable. However, Tezuka's simplified art style made the entire animation process much more efficient.

Tezuka did not enjoy his time at Toei, and he especially did not like that he felt he had no control over "his" story or the ending. This film is recognized as a massive turning point in animation history. It introduced the use of simplified art style and limited animation as labor and cost savers. It introduced Tsukioka Sadao, one of Tezuka's assistants, to Toei where he would later become the director of the studio's first TV series, and it introduced Tezuka to the animators he would later poach for his own studio.

In 1961, Tezuka entered the animation industry in Japan by founding the production company Mushi Productions as a rival of Toei Animation. His initial staff was composed of animators he had met while working on Saiyuki that he convinced to join by paying the animators more than double what Toei was paying them as well as paying for food. Their first film was Tales from a Certain Street Corner (Aru Machikado no Monogatari), an 'anti-Disney', experimental film. Just like on Saiyuki, Tezuka would often fall behind his own deadlines and the staff would have to pick up the slack only for Tezuka to take credit for it later. Tales from a Certain Street Corner was shown at a single special screening and featured many "tricks" that would be later standardized as labor-saving measures in the anime industry such as repeated and reversed animation cycles of characters dancing, frames being held for a long period of time. This same screening also featured the first screening of Tezuka's Astro Boy initial two episodes eight weeks before its original broadcast on the 5 or 6 November 1962 at the Yamaha Hall.

Astro Boy was first broadcast on New Year's Day 1963; this series would create the first successful model for animation production in Japan and would also be the first Japanese animation dubbed into English for an American audience and also created the market for children's merchandise. This is in large part because Tezuka was able to undercut his competitors, cutting costs to 2.5 million yen per episode by using techniques that would later be adopted by the television anime industry at large such as shooting on threes, stop images, repetition, sectioning, combined use, and short shots. None of these methods were invented by Tezuka or Mushi Pro, but were instead refined there. During production, the staff also found that while the short cuts were initially obvious, the use of soundscaping helped to mitigate it.

The only reason Astro Boy was able to survive its inception is because Tezuka was able to sell the foreign rights to NBC Enterprises (an important distinction from NBC itself which was the entity Tezuka believed he was selling to). The American company ordered 52 episodes, a crucial investment because Mushi Pro only had four episodes in the can and only enough resources for one episode more. In the American localization, even more over the top sound effects were used to mitigate the obviously cheap animation. The use of sound would be further utilized and exemplified in other anime to follow, leading to many of the "stock" anime sound effects modern audiences are now used to.

Selling to an American market was very restrictive, though. They were not to include any indication that the show was made in Japan, they were not to have any arc that lasted more than an episode, all street signs had to be in English, there could be no religious references, "adult" themes, or nudity. Tezuka agreed to this, claiming that it would fit better with the sci-fi setting by giving the sense of a "placelessness". However, he would soon be disappointed by the American market when a Mushi Pro representative went to discuss the next year's episode order only to find out that the Americans didn't need anymore, believing that 52 episodes were more than enough to cycle through indefinitely.

Other series were subsequently adapted to animation, including Jungle Emperor (1965), the first Japanese animated series produced in full color. Jungle Emperor was also successfully sold to NBC Enterprises who almost made Mushi Pro clothe the wild animals featured. They were finally able to negotiate "than animals were permitted to be 'naked' in natural settings, and that the depiction of black characters was permissible, as long as they were presented as 'civilized'; evil characters could still only be white."

In the late 60s and 70s, it was clear that the rise of Mushi Pro was a short one and it was sliding into bankruptcy. Tezuka's financial model was unsustainable and the company was deeply in debt. In two desperate attempts to earn enough money to pay investors, Tezuka turned to the adult film market and produced A Thousand and One Nights (1969) and Cleopatra (1970). Both attempts failed.

Tezuka stepped down as acting director in 1968 to found a new animation studio, Tezuka Productions, and continued experimenting with animation late into his life. In 1973, Mushi Productions collapsed financially; the fallout would produce several influential animation production studios, including Sunrise.

=== Gekiga graphic novels (1967–1989) ===
In 1967, in response to the magazine Garo and the gekiga movement, Tezuka created the magazine COM. By doing so, he radically changed his art from a cartoony, Disney-esque slapstick style towards a more realistic drawing style; at the time the themes of his books became focused on an adult audience. A common element in all these books and short stories is the very dark and immoral nature of the main characters. The stories are also filled with explicit violence, erotic scenes, and crime. Through the magazine, he also wanted to recreate the vision of the Manga Shōnen magazine he had contributed to in the early 1950s, making it a platform for artistic experimentation and promotion of young emerging artists.

The change of his manga from aimed at children to more 'literary' gekiga manga started with the yōkai manga Dororo in 1967. This yōkai manga was influenced by the success of and a response to Shigeru Mizuki's GeGeGe no Kitarō. Simultaneously, he also produced Vampires that, like Dororo, also introduced a stronger, more coherent storyline and a shift in the drawing style. After these two he began his true first gekiga attempt with Swallowing the Earth. Dissatisfied with the result, he soon after produced I.L.. His work Phoenix began in 1967.

Besides the well-known series Phoenix, Black Jack and Buddha, which are drawn in this style, he also produced a vast amount of one-shots or shorter series, such as Ayako, Ode to Kirihito, Alabaster, Apollo's Song, Barbara, MW, The Book of Human Insects, and a large number of short stories that were later collectively published in books such as Under the Air, Clockwork Apple, The Crater, Melody of Iron and Other Short Stories, and Record of the Glass Castle.

Tezuka would become a bit milder in narrative tone in the 1980s with his follow-up works such as Message to Adolf, Midnight, Ludwig B (unfinished), and Neo Faust.

=== Death ===
Tezuka died of stomach cancer on 9 February 1989 after he was rushed into the hospital in Tokyo. His last words were: "I'm begging you, let me work!", spoken to a nurse who had tried to take away his drawing equipment.

Although Tezuka was agnostic, he was buried in a Buddhist cemetery in Tokyo.

In 2014, it was reported that Tezuka's daughter, Rumiko Tezuka, opened a drawer to her father's desk which had been locked since his death. In it she found a half-eaten piece of chocolate, a handwritten essay about Katsuhiro Otomo in regard to his good work on Akira, sketches from his various projects, and a large number of erotic sketches of anthropomorphic animals.

== Style ==
Tezuka is known for his imaginative stories and stylized Japanese adaptations of Western literature. Tezuka's "cinematic" page layouts were influenced by Milt Gross' early graphic novel He Done Her Wrong. He read this book as a child, and its style characterized many manga artists who followed in Tezuka's footsteps.

A key component of Tezuka's style is his extensive use of quotations, which include his allusions to popular works and adoptions of trends. For instance, he incorporated multiple varieties of depth into one frame—mirroring a breakthrough technique in the realm of Hollywood film: deep-focus cinematography. Tezuka's Metropolis is an exemplar for his use of this technique, as well as for the cinematic "pans and close-ups and zooms" that created the illusion of motion in his scenes. Nonetheless: Tezuka's dyadic visual jokes—which involve the arrival of creatures at emotionally-charged scenes—disrupt the tension, reminding the reader of "the framework of fiction" and promoting a safe "mode of identification" with the narrative.

Tezuka's quotations of real trends mark a key aspect of his style: adaptation in response to the socio-cultural situation and interests of his audience. He involved the "kiss-scene" motif due to its rising popularity in Japanese film. Tezuka juxtaposed this with elements more customary to Japan, such as the "glorification of self-sacrifice": instead of the usual happy ending, one or more of his characters would meet their demise but specifically for the sake of others. Aside from these borrowed motifs, a signature characteristic of Tezuka's style is the Star System, which refers to his casting of characters into different roles across a body of comics. His characters were modified to appear in different works, similar to how actors modify their personality and appearance to suit different performances. Influenced by film, he created bipartite characters that were constituted by the performer (or the stock character) and the performance (or the role played by the stock character). In doing so, Tezuka created space for intertextual history, references and commentary. The Star System utilized "the crossover between celebrity, actor and character" and also enabled Tezuka to involve intertextuality.

Tezuka invented the distinctive "large eyes" style of Japanese animation, drawing inspiration from the eyes of the characters of the Takarazuka Revue, as well as from Western cartoon characters such as Betty Boop, Mickey Mouse, and Bambi, and from Disney movies.

=== Evolution ===
While the start of Tezuka's professional career involved four-panel comics like The Diary of Mā-chan and A Man from Mars, it was the akahon format of New Treasure Island, a comic book numbering 200 pages, that attached him to fame. The akahon is characterized by the use of senkashi paper and "bright red covers", both of which enabled easy circulation. Tezuka departed from the typical expectations of akahon by introducing complexity in The Mysterious Underground Man and morality in Magic House and Vampire Devils. Moreover, he used romaji (English) titles alongside the Japanese equivalents, as well as a subtle color palette and intricate composition—all of which were unlike other akahon. Later, Tezuka's style—which favoured akahon—had to be reinvented to serve the demands of serialized magazines. He created the "single charismatic hero", an example of which is Atom, to capture and keep the readership's attention through the episodic narratives.

== Works ==
Tezuka's complete oeuvre includes over 700 volumes, with more than 150,000 pages. Tezuka's creations include Astro Boy (Mighty Atom in Japan), Black Jack, Princess Knight, Phoenix (Hi no Tori in Japan), Kimba the White Lion (Jungle Emperor in Japan), Unico, Message to Adolf, The Amazing 3, Buddha, and Dororo. His "life's work" was Phoenix—a story of life and death that he began in the 1950s and continued until his death.

In addition, Tezuka headed the animation production studio Mushi Production ("Bug Production"), which pioneered TV animation in Japan.

=== Bibliography (manga) ===
A complete list of his works can be found on the Tezuka Osamu Manga Museum website.

- Astro Boy, 1952–68. A sequel to Captain ATOM (1951), with Atom renamed Astro Boy in the US. Eventually, Astro Boy would become Tezuka's most famous creation. He created the nuclear-powered, yet peace-loving, boy robot first after being punched in the face by a drunken GI. In 1963, Astro Boy made its debut as the first domestically produced animated program on Japanese television. The 30-minute weekly program (of which 193 episodes were produced) led to the first craze for anime in Japan. In America, the TV series (which consisted of 104 episodes licensed from the Japanese run) was also a hit, becoming the first Japanese animation to be shown on US television, although the U.S. producers downplayed and disguised the show's Japanese origins. Several other Astro Boy series have been made since, as well as a 2009 animated feature film Astro Boy.
- Kimba the White Lion, 1950–54. A shōnen manga series created by Tezuka which was serialized in the Manga Shōnen magazine. An anime based on the manga was created, broadcast in Japan from 1965 and in North America from 1966. It was the first color animated television series created in Japan.
- Princess Knight, 1953–68. One of Tezuka's most famous works and widely regarded as a classic, Princess Knight has been very influential in the manga and anime industry. Its portrayal of gender roles is ambiguously interpreted by critics; some claim it has pro-feminist ideals and others think it expresses misogynist ideals of the 1950s–60s Japanese society. Nonetheless, it would start a tradition of androgynous heroines and establish several trends in the shōjo genre. In fact, it is considered to be one of the first works in this genre that was narrative-focused and that portrays a female superhero.
- Phoenix, 1954–88. Tezuka's most profound and ambitious work, dealing with man's quest for immortality, ranging from the distant past to the far future. The central character is the Phoenix, the physical manifestation of the cosmos, who carries within itself the power of immortality; either granted by the Phoenix or taken from the Phoenix by drinking a small amount of its blood. Other characters appear and reappear throughout the series; usually due to their reincarnation. The work remained unfinished at the time of Tezuka's death in 1989. Phoenix has been filmed several times, most notably as Phoenix 2772 (1980). Baku Yumemakura was influenced by Phoenix; Yumemakura would go on to write the script for Boku no Son Goku.
- Dororo, 1967–68, is a manga series about a boy called Hyakkimaru who has been robbed of 48 of his body parts by 48 different devils. In order for him to retrieve a stolen part, he must eliminate the devil that stole it. Hyakkimaru meets a boy thief, Dororo, and together they travel while being constantly attacked by ghosts and monsters. In 1969, the manga series was adapted into an anime that consisted of 26 episodes. In 2019, nearly 50 years later, the manga series was re-adapted into another anime series with 24 episodes.
- Buddha, 1972–83, is Tezuka's unique interpretation of the life of Gautama Buddha, the founder of Buddhism. The critically acclaimed series is often referred to as a gritty portrayal of the Buddha's life. The series began in September 1972 and ended in December 1983, as one of Tezuka's last epic manga works. Nearly three decades after the manga was completed, two anime film adaptations were released in 2011 and 2014.
- Black Jack, 1973–83. The story of Black Jack, a talented surgeon who operates illegally, using radical and supernatural techniques to combat rare afflictions. Black Jack received the Japan Cartoonists' Association Special Award in 1975 and the Koudansha Manga Award in 1977. Three Black Jack TV movies were released between 2000 and 2001. In fall 2004, an anime television series was aired in Japan with 61 episodes, releasing another movie afterward. A new series, titled Black Jack 21, started broadcasting on 10 April 2006. In September 2008, the first volume of the manga had been published in English by Vertical Publishing and more volumes are being published to this day.

== Personal life ==
Tezuka was a descendant of Hattori Hanzō, a famous ninja and samurai who faithfully served Tokugawa Ieyasu during the Sengoku period in Japan.

Tezuka's childhood nickname was gashagasha-atama: "messy head" (gashagasha is slang for messy, atama means head). As a child, Tezuka's arms swelled up and he became ill. He was treated and cured by a doctor, which made him also want to be a doctor. At a crossing point, he asked his mother whether he should look into doing manga full-time or whether he should become a doctor. At the time, being a manga author was not a particularly rewarding job. The answer his mother gave was: "You should work doing the thing you like most of all." Tezuka decided to devote himself to manga creation on a full-time basis. He graduated from Osaka University and obtained his medical degree, but he would later use his medical and scientific knowledge to enrich his sci-fi manga, such as Black Jack.

Tezuka enjoyed insect collecting and entomology (even adding the character 虫 'bug' to his pen name), Disney, and baseball—in fact, he licensed the "grown up" version of his character Kimba the White Lion as the logo for the Seibu Lions of the Nippon Professional Baseball League. A fan of Superman, Tezuka was honorary chairman of Japan's Superman Fan Club.

In 1959 Osamu Tezuka married Etsuko Okada at a Takarazuka hotel.

Tezuka met Walt Disney in person at the 1964 New York World's Fair. In a 1986 entry in his personal diary, Tezuka stated that Disney wanted to hire him for a potential science fiction project.

In January 1965, Tezuka received a letter from American film director Stanley Kubrick, who had watched Astro Boy and wanted to invite Tezuka to be the art director of his next movie, 2001: A Space Odyssey (which was eventually released in 1968). Although flattered by Kubrick's invitation, Tezuka's schedule did not allow him to leave his studio for a year to live in England, so he had to turn down the offer. Although he was not able to work on 2001, he loved the film, and would play its soundtrack at maximum volume in his studio to keep him awake during long nights of work.

Tezuka's son Makoto Tezuka became a film and anime director.

== Legacy and influence ==
Stamps were issued in Tezuka's honor in 1997. Also, beginning in 2003, the Japanese toy company Kaiyodo began manufacturing a series of figurines of Tezuka's creations, including Princess Knight, Unico, the Phoenix, Dororo, Marvelous Melmo, Ambassador Magma, and many others. To date, three series of the figurines have been released.

Tezuka's legacy has continued to be honored among manga artists and animators and companies. He guided many well-known manga artists, such as Shotaro Ishinomori and Go Nagai. From 2003 to 2009, Urasawa and Takashi Nagasaki adapted an arc of Astro Boy into the murder mystery series Pluto.

His legacy also extends to cartoonists outside of Japan. Will Eisner called himself an 'ardent admirer' of Tezuka's work. Jean Giraud (Mœbius) called him 'a great artist, and a fascinating personality'. Craig Thompson called him 'Japan's greatest cartoonist'. Art Spiegelman compared his place in the history of manga to that of Siddhartha's in Buddhism. Chester Brown has praised his dramatic skills, stating that they 'make the pages fly by.' Scott McCloud has stated that he had a bookshelf of untranslated Tezuka which he 'studied like the Torah for hours on end'. Dash Shaw called him 'the absolute greatest'.

Film director Akira Kurosawa was a fan of Tezuka's comics. He owned his collected works, and sought for him to be artistic director on an Edgar Allan Poe adaptation which never got off the ground. Stanley Kubrick was a fan of Tezuka's 1963 Astro Boy anime. Film director Guillermo del Toro has cited Tezuka as an influence. Video game designers such as Shigeru Miyamoto and Yuji Horii have stated that they were influenced by Tezuka's works and video games such as Mega Man, Jumping Flash! and Chaos Seed have cited Tezuka's work as a source of influence. Hideo Kojima mentions Tezuka's work as being one of the most impressionable parts of the Expo '70, which he considers to be a formative experience on himself as an adolescent youth. Fumito Ueda mentions Tezuka's 'One Million Year Trip: Bandar Book' as an anime which left a strong impression on him growing up.

In 'The Top 100 Historical Persons in Japan' poll held by Nippon Television in 2006, Tezuka ranked 24th, the only mangaka to make the list. In a variation of the poll, asking for the 'Greatest Geniuses in History', Tezuka ranked 11th, ahead of Fujiko F. Fujio and Shotaro Ishinomori, the only other two mangaka to make the list. He also ranked 54th on the 'Greatest Heroes of History' variation, again the only mangaka on the list.

In the 2006 list by the Japan Media Arts Festival asking critics, scholars, mangaka, etc. for the 'Greatest Manga of All Time', Tezuka had three works make the top 10: Phoenix(1st), Black Jack(5th) and Astro Boy(tied 6th). He was the only figure with more than one work in the top 10.

Tezuka was a personal friend (and apparent artistic influence) of Brazilian comic book artist Mauricio de Sousa. In 2012, Maurício published a two-issue story arc in the Monica Teen comic book featuring some of Tezuka's main characters, including Astro Boy, Black Jack, Sapphire, and Kimba, joining Monica and her friends in an adventure in the Amazon rainforest against a smuggling organization chopping down hundreds of trees. This was the first time that Tezuka Productions allowed overseas artists to use Tezuka's characters. On November 14, 2018, a Monica Toy short featuring Astro Boy was uploaded on YouTube in honor of Tezuka's spiritual 90th birthday.

In October 2019, a project was announced called Tezuka 2020, which is AI-illustrated manga in his style. At first, the illustrations were distorted and horrifying, but after studying actual human faces, the illustrations looked more like his. After looking through thousands of AI-generated pictures, one stood out, and the illustrator Urumu Tsunogai created the new protagonist. In 2020, an AI writer-artist made by Kioxia was tasked to make a new "Tezuka" manga called Paidon, which takes place in a futuristic apocalyptic society, which was released in the magazine Morning on 27 February 2020. It is part of the project, which will also be drawn by physical human beings such as Shigeto Ikehara, Kenichi Kiriki, and Urumu Tsunogai. Tezuka's son held a ceremony on 26 February 2020, to introduce people to the manga. The publisher of the magazine already confirmed that a sequel is in production. The manga was published in English on June 4, 2020, under the name Phaedo.

=== Awards and recognition ===
- 1957 Shogakukan Manga Award for Manga Seminar on Biology and Biiko-chan
- 1975 Bungeishunjū manga Award
- 1975 Japan Cartoonists Association Award—Special Award
- 1977 Kodansha Manga Award for Black Jack and The Three-Eyed One
- 1980 Inkpot Award, San Diego Comic-Con
- 1983 Shogakukan Manga Award for Hidamari no Ki
- 1984 Animafest Zagreb Grand Prize for Jumping
- 1985 Hiroshima International Animation Festival for Onboro-Film
- 1986 Kodansha Manga Award for Message to Adolf
- 1989 Nihon SF Taisho Award – Special Award
- 1989-1990 Winsor McCay Award – Lifetime or career contributions in animation
- 1989 Order of the Sacred Treasure, 3rd class (posthumous)
- 2002 Eisner Hall of Fame
- 2004 Eisner Award for Buddha (vols. 1–2)
- 2005 Eisner Award for Buddha (vols. 3–4)
- 2009 Eisner Award for Dororo
- 2014 Eisner Award for The Mysterious Underground Men

=== Osamu Tezuka Manga Museum ===
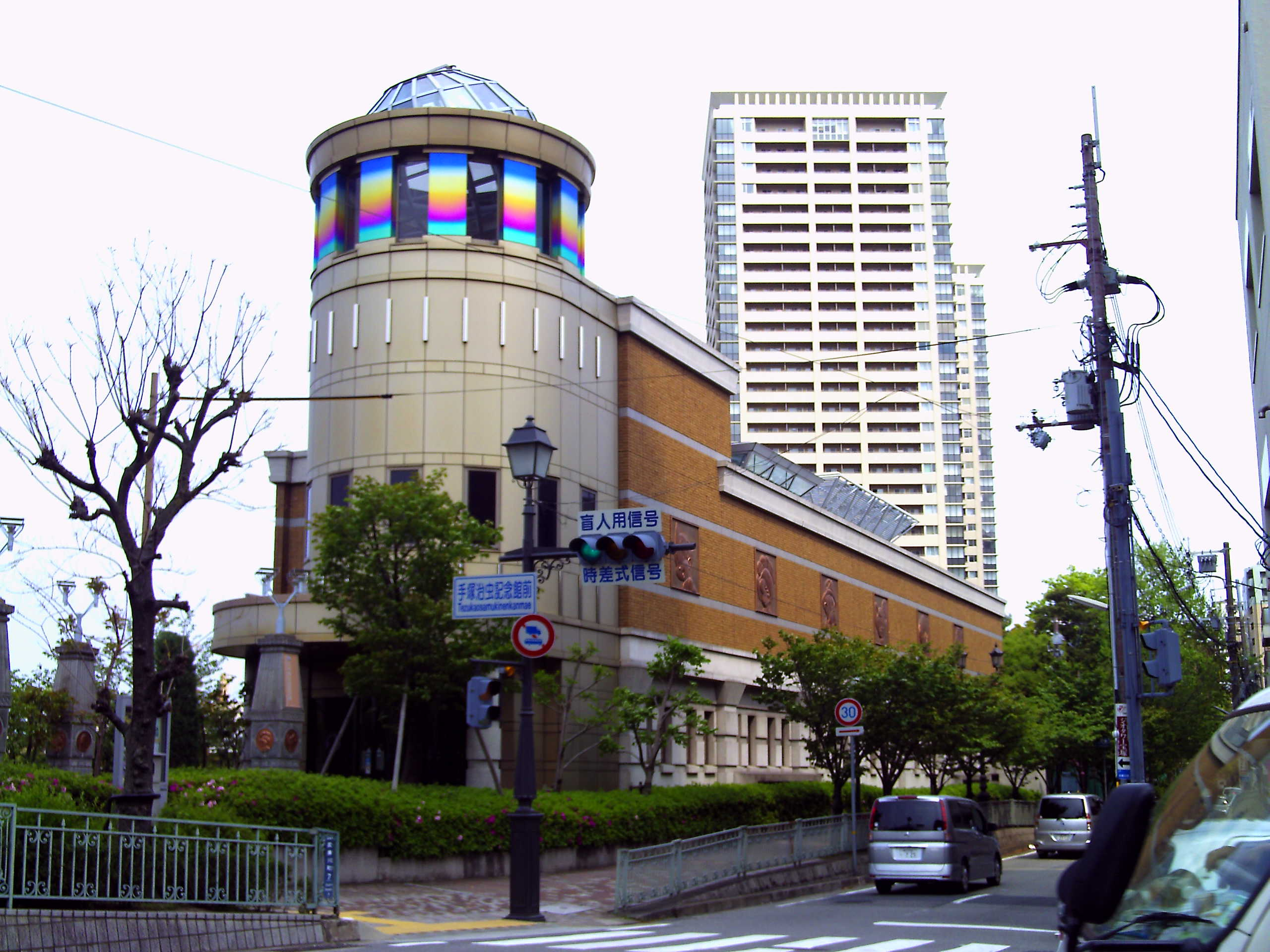
The Osamu Tezuka Manga Museum

The city of Takarazuka, Hyōgo, where Tezuka grew up, opened a museum in his memory. The Osamu Tezuka Manga Museum (宝塚市立手塚治虫記念館; lit. "Takarazuka City Tezuka Osamu Memorial Hall") was inaugurated on 25 April 1994, and has three floors (15069.47 ft^{2}). In the basement there is an "Animation Workshop" in which visitors can make their own animation, and a mockup of the city of Takarazuka and a replica of the table where Osamu Tezuka worked.

Outside of the building's entrance, there are imitations of the hands and feet of several characters from Tezuka (as in a true walk of fame) and on the inside, the entry hall, a replica of Princess Knight's furniture. On the same floor is a permanent exhibition of manga and a room for the display of anime. The exhibition is divided into two parts: Osamu Tezuka and the city of Takarazuka and Osamu Tezuka, the author.

The second floor contains, along with several exhibitions, a manga library with five hundred works of Tezuka (some foreign editions are also present), a video library, and a lounge with decor inspired by Kimba the White Lion.

There is also a glass sculpture that represents the planet Earth and is based on a book written by Tezuka in his childhood called Our Earth of Glass.

== See also ==
- Makoto Tezuka
- List of Osamu Tezuka manga
- List of Osamu Tezuka anime
- Tezuka Award
- Tezuka Osamu Cultural Prize
- Tezuka Productions
- Tokiwa-sō
- Pictures at an Exhibition
