= Takashi Nagasaki =

Japanese manga writer and editor

- 長崎尚志
- Born: January 14, 1956 (age 70); Sendai, Miyagi, Japan
- Other names: Richard Woo, Big O, Garaku Toshusai, Keishi Edogawa
- Occupations: Author, manga writer, manga editor
- Years active: 1980–present
- Awards: Tezuka Osamu Cultural Prize (2005); Seiun Award (2008, 2010); Max & Moritz Prize (2014); Saito Takao Award (2018); Harvey Award (2026)

Takashi Nagasaki (長崎尚志; born January 14, 1956) is a Japanese author, manga writer and former editor of manga. He started his professional career at Shogakukan in 1980 and worked as an editor on the publisher's various manga magazines, including as editor-in-chief of Big Comic Spirits from July 1999 to 2001. Since becoming freelance, Nagasaki has worked as an author under various pen names, such as Keishi Edogawa (江戸川啓視), Garaku Toshusai (東周斎雅楽), Big O (ビッグ・オー) and Richard Woo (リチャード・ウー).

He is best known for his collaborations with Naoki Urasawa, such as Pluto (2003–2009) and Billy Bat (2008–2016). The Kobe Shimbun wrote that Nagasaki brought the concept of a producer into the manga industry, and in doing so "established a new relationship with manga artists." Brian Ruh of Anime News Network described Nagasaki as the only editor who "has risen to the level of co-creator alongside the artist."

== Career ==
=== 1980–2001: Shogakukan ===
Due to his father's job, Nagasaki lived in Hiroshima from first to fourth grade. Nagasaki joined publisher Shogakukan as an editor in 1980. He worked on their manga magazines Big Comic, Weekly Shōnen Sunday, Big Comic Original and Big Comic Superior. In the mid-1980s, he was editor to Takao Saito on Golgo 13. Nagasaki is also one of the people credited for editing Rumiko Takahashi's Ranma ½. In July 1999, he became editor-in-chief of Big Comic Spirits and held the position until leaving Shogakukan in 2001.

Nagasaki first met Naoki Urasawa when he was assigned to be the editor of the newly debuting manga artist. The two collaborate so frequently, that Nagasaki has been called Urasawa's "producer." However, Nagasaki said he does not call himself a producer and described his "workload" as being the same as a manga editor's. Although they continue to collaborate even after Nagasaki became freelance, they rarely socialize outside of work. It was Nagasaki who came up with the premise for Urasawa and Kazuya Kudo's Pineapple Army (1985–1988). Nagasaki was a co-author of Urasawa and Hokusei Katsushika's adventure series Master Keaton (1988–1994). It was later adapted into a television anime and original video animation series between 1998 and 2000. From 1994 to 2001, Nagasaki collaborated with Urasawa on the story for the thriller Monster. They co-wrote a companion novel titled Another Monster in 2002, and the manga was adapted into an anime in 2004. The duo also collaborated from 1999 to 2007 on the story for the science fiction mystery 20th Century Boys and its sequel 21st Century Boys. The two series earned them the 2008 Seiun Award for Best Comic, and won many other awards. Nagasaki was also one of the scriptwriters of the three live-action film adaptations of 20th Century Boys, released between 2008 and 2009.

=== 2001–present: Freelance ===
After becoming freelance in 2001, Nagasaki has worked as an author under his own name and various pen names, such as Keishi Edogawa, Garaku Toshusai, Big O and Richard Woo. He explained that he never intended to become famous as an author, and so felt that anything would be fine for a pen name. As Edogawa, he created the 2002 manga Purungil -Ao no Michi- with illustrator Kwon Kaya for Weekly Comic Bunch. It was later adapted into the 2026 South Korean TV series The Blue Road. With Urasawa, Nagasaki co-authored Pluto (2003–2009), a re-imagining of Astro Boy by Osamu Tezuka. It won numerous awards including, the ninth Tezuka Osamu Cultural Prize (2005), an Excellence Prize at the seventh Japan Media Arts Festival (2005), and the 2010 Seiun Award for Best Comic. It was later adapted into the 2023 anime Pluto.

From 2006 to 2009, Richard Woo worked with Shinichi Sugimura on Dias Police: Ihō Keisatsu for Kodansha's Morning. In 2016, the manga was adapted into a 10-episode TV drama and a theatrical film, and the duo created a short sequel arc subtitled 999-hen. In 2008, Nagasaki and Urasawa began the mystery series Billy Bat in Morning. The manga won the 2014 Max & Moritz Prize for Best International Comic, before ending in 2016. The English edition later won the 2026 Harvey Award for Best Manga. Also in 2008, Nagasaki and Urasawa took guest teaching posts at Nagoya Zokei University, where they taught "Modern Expression Course: Manga Classes" two to three times a year, although the class met every month. That same year, Nagasaki teamed up with Seimu Yoshizaki for the female detective manga Deka Girl, which ran in Kodansha's Kiss Plus until August 2011. In 2009, he created the two-part manga SQ with Kira for Shueisha's You. Nagasaki wrote the historical novel Arutantahā Tōhō Kenmonroku Kitan for Kodansha's Pandora Vol.2 Side-B magazine, before it was published as a standalone book in 2010.

Nagasaki teamed up with Junji Ito and former diplomat Masaru Sato to create Yūkoku no Rasputin (2010–2012), based on Sato's personal experiences in Russia, for Big Comic. To celebrate the 90th anniversary of Shogakukan, Nagasaki produced a 2011 picture book adaptation of Kosuke Hamada's story Red Oni Cries that was illustrated by Urasawa. In April 2012, Shinchosha published the first novel in what would become Nagasaki's Daigo Shinji no Hakuran Suiri Files franchise that follows a manga editor who solves mysteries. As of 2018, it is composed of three novels and two TV drama adaptations broadcast by Wowow that star Arata Furuta as the title character. Richard Woo and Koji Kono's Kurokōchi ran in Nihon Bungeisha's Weekly Manga Goraku from 2012 to 2018. It was adapted into a 10-episode TV drama in 2013. From 2012 to 2014, Nagasaki and Urasawa created Master Keaton Remaster as a sequel set 20 years after the original series. Nagasaki reunited with Yoshizaki to create the science fiction detective series Usagi Tantei Monogatari (2012–2013) for Kodansha's Kiss. At the end of 2012, Nagasaki started working with Michitsune Nakajima on Yamaterasu Code, which was serialized in Shueisha's Jump X until the magazine was cancelled in 2014. As Richard Woo, he and Yoshizaki created Abracadabra: Ryōki Hanzai Tokusōshitsu in Big Comic Original Zōkan from 2014 to 2020. The series earned them the 2018 Saito Takao Award. Nagasaki has served on the award's final selection committee every year since.

Nagasaki wrote ZIG, illustrated by Tetsuya Saruwatari, for Shueisha's Grand Jump in 2017. In 2018, Richard Woo began Himiko -Shinsetsu Yamataikoku-den-, about the ancient queen of the same name, with Mariko Nakamura in Big Comic Original. The following year, he reunited with Kono to begin Keibuho Daimajin in Weekly Manga Goraku. Richard Woo created M no Shirushi -MacArthur Ansatsu Keikaku- in 2020 alongside Ryoichi Ikegami for Shogakukan's Big Comic Superior. It tells the story of a plot to assassinate Douglas MacArthur. Nagasaki was one of the writers of the June 2021 film Character. It was adapted into a manga for Monthly Big Comic Spirits by Akira Iwaya in March, and Nagasaki wrote a novelization published in May. He and Kōsuke Muku created the horror story Child from the Dark in Big Comic from November 25, 2021, to August 10, 2022. It is based on Nagasaki's novel Yomi Nemuru Mori -Daigo Shinji no Hakuran Suiri File-. Upon completion, it was revealed that "Kōsuke Muku" was a pen name of Makoto Isshiki and that she would be credited by her real name in the tankōbon.

Richard Woo and Yoshizaki began the suspense manga Minzoku Gakusha Akasaka Yaichirō no Jiken-bo in the October 2022 issue of Kodansha's Monthly Afternoon, which was released on August 24, 2022.

== Philosophy ==
Nagasaki has been involved in every aspect of manga creation except drawing, this includes planning, scenario writing, and advertising. He said his level of involvement depends on what the editor and manga artist want. It was while working as an editor, that a boss once called a manga story written by someone else boring and told Nagasaki to fix it. In addition to finding it faster to just write the story himself from the get-go, Nagasaki began to enjoy it the more he did it, until finally deciding to switch jobs from editor to manga author because he felt it would be more interesting. He works on the condition that his story scenarios will not be changed, but will change them himself if a good suggestion is given.

Nagasaki has stated that "creation is an evolution beyond imitation." Believing that no one thinks of something from scratch, he said that when one feels like they came up with a story on their own, it is actually them imitating without knowing it. Nagasaki reads and watches a lot of novels and movies, which he analyzes as practice. He will watch half a film, try to predict the rest of the story, and then watch the remaining half to see if he was correct. He said he does not get writer's block, but prefers to be given some kind of description of the intended manga instead of being told to "write whatever you want." Noting how writing manga is different from writing novels, he said that the latter are evaluated and rewarded based on one finished book, but manga is rewarded for being interesting in the middle of its story. In 2018, Nagasaki said he believed that the manga industry was shifting from "character-oriented" works to "story-oriented" ones.

Nagasaki believes that the illustrating artist determines whether or not a manga will be a hit. He described the artist as taking the lead role, while the author is the supporting role. As an example, Nagasaki takes pictures to aid the illustrator as references. If you compare manga to TV or film, Nagasaki said, "the original author is a scriptwriter. The editor is a producer, and the rest of the director, actors, cameras, and music are all done by a manga artist." He explained that a boring scenario can still be made into a hit by a good artist. Similarly, Nagasaki has also said that if the artist can not compose or divide frames well, it will create a boring work even if the scenario is good. This is derived from something he learned from Takao Saito; "the basis for manga is composition." Meaning, even if your drawing is poor, readers will continue to read if you are good at composition.

== Works ==
=== Manga ===
==== As Takashi Nagasaki ====
Title	Role and notes	Year(s)	Ref.
Master Keaton (MASTERキートン, Masutā Kīton)	Co-author alongside Hokusei Katsushika and Naoki Urasawa, editor	1988–1994	
Monster (モンスター, Monsutā)	Story co-producer alongside Naoki Urasawa, editor, supervisor	1994–2001	
20th Century Boys (20世紀少年) / 21st Century Boys (21世紀少年)	Story co-producer alongside Naoki Urasawa	1999–2006, 2007	
Pluto (プルートウ, Purūtō)	Co-author alongside Naoki Urasawa, based on Astro Boy by Osamu Tezuka, supervised by Macoto Tezka	2003–2009	
Shūsen no Lorelei (終戦のローレライ)	Dramatization, illustrated by Takayuki Kosai, based on the novel of the same name by Harutoshi Fukui	2005–2007	
"Throw Toward the Moon!" (月に向かって投げろ!, Tsuki ni Mukatte Nagero!)	Story co-producer alongside Naoki Urasawa	2006	
Billy Bat (ビリーバット, Birī Batto)	Co-author alongside Naoki Urasawa	2008–2016	
Deka Girl (デカガール, Deka Gāru)	Author, illustrated by Seimu Yoshizaki	2008–2011	
SQ	Author, illustrated by Kira	2009–2010	
Yūkoku no Rasputin (憂国のラスプーチン)	Screenplay, written by Masaru Sato, illustrated by Junji Ito	2010–2012	
Red Oni Cries (泣いた赤鬼)	Producer of the picture book, illustrated by Naoki Urasawa, based on Kosuke Hamada's story of the same name	2011	
Master Keaton Remaster (MASTERキートン Reマスター, Masutā Kīton Rimasutā)	Co-author alongside Naoki Urasawa	2012–2014	
Usagi Tantei Monogatari (うさぎ探偵物語)	Author, illustrated by Seimu Yoshizaki	2012–2013	
Yamaterasu Code (ヤマテラス・コード)	Author, illustrated by Michitsune Nakajima	2012–2014	
ZIG	Author, illustrated by Tetsuya Saruwatari	2017	
King of Eden (エデンの王, Eden no Ō)	Author, illustrated by Ignito	2017–2019	
Character (キャラクター)	Co-writer alongside Anna Kawahara and Akira Nagai, illustrated by Akira Iwaya	2021	
Child from the Dark (闇の少年, Aida no Shōnen)	Author, illustrated by Kōsuke Muku/Makoto Isshiki, based on Nagasaki's novel Yomi Nemuru Mori -Daigo Shinji no Hakuran Suiri File-	2021–2022	

==== As Richard Woo ====
Title	Role and notes	Year(s)	Ref.
Dias Police: Ihō Keisatsu (ディアスポリス 異邦警察)	Screenplay, illustrated by Shinichi Sugimura	2006–2009	
Kurokōchi (クロコーチ)	Screenplay, illustrated by Koji Kono	2012–2018	
Abracadabra: Ryōki Hanzai Tokusōshitsu (アブラカダブラ 〜猟奇犯罪特捜室〜)	Author, illustrated by Seimu Yoshizaki	2014–2020	
Dias Police: Ihō Keisatsu 999-hen (ディアスポリス -異邦警察- 999篇)	Screenplay, illustrated by Shinichi Sugimura	2016	
Himiko -Shinsetsu Yamataikoku-den- (卑弥呼 －真説・邪馬台国伝－)	Author, illustrated by Mariko Nakamura	2018–present	
Keibuho Daimajin (警部補ダイマジン)	Author, illustrated by Koji Kono	2019–present	
Shigatsu Ichi Nichi no Ema (四月一日のエマ)	Author, illustrated by Hitsuji Ikuta	2019	
M no Shirushi -MacArthur Ansatsu Keikaku- (Mの首級 マッカーサー暗殺計画)	Author, illustrated by Ryoichi Ikegami	2020	
Minzoku Gakusha Akasaka Yaichirō no Jiken-bo (民俗学者 赤坂弥一郎の事件簿)	Author, illustrated by Seimu Yoshizaki	2022–2023	

==== Under other names ====
Title	Role and notes	Year(s)	Ref.
Purungil -Ao no Michi- (プルンギル -青の道-)	Author as Keishi Edogawa, illustrated by Kwon Kaya	2002–2003	
Iliad -Iliad Memorandum- (イリヤッド-入矢堂見聞録-)	Author as Toshusai Garaku, illustrated by Osamu Uoto	2002–2007	
Golgo 13 (ゴルゴ13)	Screenplay for chapters 429 and 555 as Keishi Edogawa, illustrated by Takao Saito	2003, 2015	
Telekinesis Yamate TV Kinema Shitsu (テレキネシス 山手テレビキネマ室)	Author as Toshusai Garaku, illustrated by Seimu Yoshizaki	2004–2007	
Zenith (ジナス)	Story co-producer as Big O alongside Satoshi Yoshida	2005–2008	

=== Novels ===
Title	Role and notes	Year(s)	Ref.
Another Monster (もうひとつのMONSTER)	Co-author alongside Naoki Urasawa	2002	
Arutantahā Tōhō Kenmonroku Kitan (アルタンタハー 東方見聞録奇譚)	Author	2010 (Note: Its first story was previously published in Pandora Vol.2 Side-B in December 2008.)	
Yami no Bansō-sha -Daigo Shinji no Ryōki Jiken File- (闇の伴走者―醍醐真司の猟奇事件ファイル―) (Note: Republished in 2015 as Yami no Bansō-sha -Daigo Shinji no Hakuran Suiri File- (闇の伴走者―醍醐真司の博覧推理ファイル―).)	Author	2012	
Yomi Nemuru Mori -Daigo Shinji no Hakuran Suiri File- (黄泉眠る森―醍醐真司の博覧推理ファイル―) (Note: Republished in 2017 as Yamataikoku to Yomi no Mori -Daigo Shinji no Hakuran Suiri File- (邪馬台国と黄泉の森―醍醐真司の博覧推理ファイル―).)	Author	2015	
Piledriver (パイルドライバー) (Note: Republished in 2018 as Kenkei Ryōki Hanzai Advisor Hisai Jūgo Piledriver (県警猟奇犯罪アドバイザー・久井重吾 パイルドライバー).)	Author	2016	
Henshū-chō no Jōken -Daigo Shinji no Hakuran Suiri File- (編集長の条件―醍醐真司の博覧推理ファイル―)	Author	2018	
Dragon Sleeper (ドラゴンスリーパー) (Note: Republished in 2020 as Kenkei Ryōki Hanzai Advisor Hisai Jūgo Dragon Sleeper (県警猟奇犯罪アドバイザー・久井重吾 ドラゴンスリーパー).)	Author	2018	
Kaze wa Zutto Fuite Iru (風はずっと吹いている)	Author	2019	
Character	Author	2021	

=== Film ===
Title	Role and notes	Year(s)	Ref.
Happy!	Supervisor	2006	
Happy! 2	Supervisor	2006	
20th Century Boys: Beginning of the End	Co-writer of the screenplay alongside Yasushi Fukuda, Naoki Urasawa and Yusuke Watanabe	2008	
20th Century Boys 2: The Last Hope	Co-writer of the screenplay alongside Yusuke Watanabe, supervised by Naoki Urasawa	2009	
20th Century Boys 3: Redemption	Co-writer of the screenplay alongside Naoki Urasawa	2009	
Character	Co-writer of the screenplay alongside Anna Kawahara and Akira Nagai	2021	
