= Harvey Award for Best Manga =

American award for translated manga

Best Manga
- Awarded for: "Best single manga of the year translated into English."
- Country: United States
- First award: 2018

The Harvey Award for Best Manga, established in 2018 as part of the Harvey Awards, is an annual American award for manga. Per the Harvey Awards website, the award honors the "best single manga of the year translated into English."

In 2018, the Harvey Awards were revamped into six categories, recognizing works as opposed to individual creators as in previous years.

== Recipients ==
Best Manga winners and finalists
Year	Title	Author	Translator	Publisher	Ref.
2018	My Lesbian Experience with Loneliness	Nagata Kabi		Seven Seas Entertainment	
2018	My Brother's Husband	Gengoroh Tagame	Anne Ishii	Pantheon Books	
2018	My Hero Academia	Kōhei Horikoshi		Viz Media	
2018	Tokyo Ghoul	Sui Ishida		Viz Media	
2018	Your Name	Makoto Shinkai and Ranmaru Kotone		Yen Press	
2019	My Hero Academia	Kōhei Horikoshi		Viz Media	
2019	Frankenstein: Junji Ito Story Collection	Junji Ito		Viz Media	
2019	Mob Psycho 100	One		Dark Horse Comics	
2019	Our Dreams at Dusk	Yuhki Kamatani		Seven Seas Entertainment	
2019	Smashed	Junji Ito		Viz Media	
2019	Witch Hat Atelier	Kamome Shirahama		Kodansha USA	
2020	Witch Hat Atelier	Kamome Shirahama		Kodansha USA	
2020	H.P. Lovecraft's At Mountains of Madness	Gou Tanabe		Dark Horse Comics	
2020	The Man Without Talent	Yoshiharu Tsuge		New York Review Comics	
2020	The Poe Clan	Moto Hagio		Fantagraphics Books	
2020	The Way of the Househusband	Kousuke Oono		Viz Media	
2021	Chainsaw Man	Tatsuki Fujimoto	Amanda Haley	Viz Media	
2021	Asadora!	Naoki Urasawa		Viz Media	
2021	Boys Run the Riot	Keito Gaku		Kodansha USA	
2021	Remina	Junji Ito		Viz Media	
2021	Spy × Family	Tatsuya Endo		Viz Media	
2022	Chainsaw Man	Tatsuki Fujimoto	Amanda Haley	Viz Media	
2022	Blood on the Tracks	Shūzō Oshimi	Daniel Komen	Vertical	
2022	Blue Lock	Muneyuki Kaneshiro and Yusuke Nomura	Nate Derr	Kodansha USA	
2022	Cat + Gamer	Wataru Nadatani	Zack Davisson	Dark Horse Comics	
2022	Red Flowers	Yoshiharu Tsuge	Ryan Holmberg	Drawn & Quarterly	
2022	Spy × Family	Tatsuya Endo	Casey Loe	Viz Media	
2023	Chainsaw Man	Tatsuki Fujimoto	Amanda Haley	Viz Media	
2023	Cat + Gamer	Wataru Nadatani	Zack Davisson	Dark Horse Comics	
2023	Goodbye, Eri	Tatsuki Fujimoto	Amanda Haley	Viz Media	
2023	Shuna's Journey	Hayao Miyazaki	Alex Dudok de Wit	First Second Books	
2023	Spy × Family	Tatsuya Endo	Casey Loe	Viz Media	
2024	Delicious in Dungeon	Ryoko Kui	Taylor Engel	Yen Press	
2024	The Summer Hikaru Died	Mokumokuren	Ajani Oloye	Yen Press	
2024	Witch Hat Atelier	Kamome Shirahama	Stephen Kohler	Kodansha USA	
2024	Frieren: Beyond Journey’s End	Kanehito Yamada and Tsukasa Abe	Misa	Viz Media	
2024	Soichi: Junji Ito Story Collection	Junji Ito		Viz Media	
2024	H.P. Lovecraft’s The Shadow Over Innsmouth	Gou Tanabe	Zack Davisson	Dark Horse Comics	
2024	Berserk Deluxe Edition Vol 14	Kentaro Miura	Duane Johnson	Dark Horse Comics	
2024	Second Hand Love	Murasaki Yamada	Ryan Holmberg	Drawn & Quarterly	
2024	My Picture Diary	Maki Fujiwara	Ryan Holmberg	Drawn & Quarterly	
2024	Okinawa	Susumu Higa	Jocelyne Allen	Fantagraphics Books	
2025	Witch Hat Atelier	Kamome Shirahama	Stephen Kohler	Kodansha USA	
2025	The Guy She Was Interested in Wasn't a Guy at All	Sumiko Arai	Ajani Oloye	Yen Press	
2025	The Summer Hikaru Died	Mokumokuren	Ajani Oloye	Yen Press	
2025	Tokyo These Days	Taiyō Matsumoto	Michael Arias	Viz Media	
2025	Wind Breaker	Satoru Nii	Jacqueline Fung	Kodansha USA	
2026	Billy Bat	Naoki Urasawa and Takashi Nagasaki	Kristi Iwashiro	Kana	
2026	He Rolled Me Up Like a Grilled Squid	Yoshiharu Tsuge	Ryan Holmberg	Drawn & Quarterly	
2026	Land	Kazumi Yamashita	Kevin Gifford	Yen Press	
2026	Miss Ruki	Fumiko Takano	Alexa Frank	New York Review Comics	
2026	My Gorilla Family	Iijima Ichiro	Ryan Holmberg	Living the Line	
2026	My Life in 24 Frames Per Second	Rintaro	Montana Kane	Kana	
