= Naoki Urasawa =

Japanese manga artist and musician (born 1960)

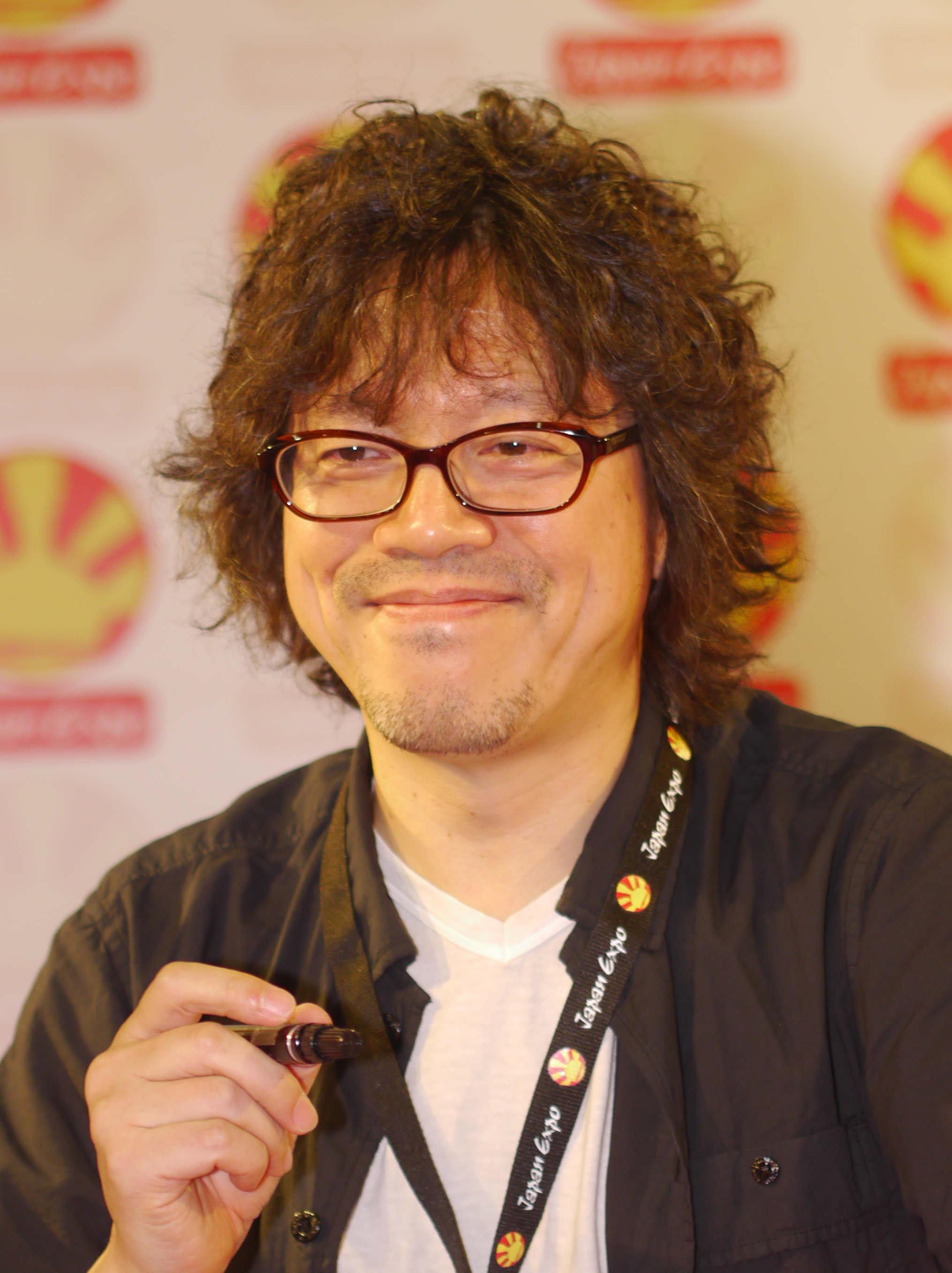
- Urasawa at the 2012 Japan Expo
- Born: Naoki Urasawa 浦沢 直樹; January 2, 1960 (age 66); Fuchū, Tokyo, Japan
- Education: Meisei University
- Occupations: Manga artist, musician, TV and radio presenter
- Writing career
- Years active: 1981–present
- Subject: Seinen manga
- Notable works: 20th Century Boys; Monster; Pluto; Billy Bat; Yawara!; Master Keaton; Happy!
- Notable awards: Shogakukan Manga Award (1989, 2000, 2002); Tezuka Osamu Cultural Prize (1999, 2005); Eisner Awards (2011, 2013)

Naoki Urasawa (Japanese: 浦沢 直樹, Hepburn: Urasawa Naoki; born January 2, 1960) is a Japanese manga artist and musician. He has been drawing manga since he was four years old, and for most of his professional career has created two series simultaneously. The stories to many of these were co-written in collaboration with his former editor, Takashi Nagasaki. Urasawa has been called one of the artists that changed the history of manga and has won numerous awards, including the Shogakukan Manga Award three times, the Tezuka Osamu Cultural Prize twice, and the Kodansha Manga Award once. South Korean filmmaker Bong Joon-ho called him "the greatest storyteller of our time", while Dominican-American writer Junot Díaz proclaimed Urasawa to be a national treasure in Japan. By December 2021, his various works had over 140 million copies in circulation worldwide, making him one of the best-selling authors of all time.

Urasawa's first major work was illustrating the action series Pineapple Army (1985–1988), which was written by Kazuya Kudo. The first serial that he wrote and illustrated himself, and his first major success, was the sports manga Yawara! (1986–1993). He then illustrated the adventure series Master Keaton (1988–1994), which was written by Hokusei Katsushika and Nagasaki, and created the sports manga Happy! (1993–1999). The thriller Monster (1994–2001) was his first to receive international acclaim and success, which continued with the science fiction mystery 20th Century Boys (1999–2006). Following the acclaimed Pluto (2003–2009), which is a re-imagining of Astro Boy by Osamu Tezuka, one of Urasawa's biggest influences, he and Nagasaki created the mystery series Billy Bat (2008–2016). After two short series, a sequel to Master Keaton with Nagasaki and Mujirushi: The Sign of Dreams, Urasawa began his currently ongoing Asadora! in 2018.

== Early life ==
Urasawa cited Osamu Tezuka as one of his heroes, being particularly fond of his manga Phoenix. "The Greatest Robot on Earth" and "The Artificial Sun" arcs of Tezuka's Astro Boy were his first experiences with manga at four or five years old. Around that same age is when he started to draw manga, and at eight he created his first complete story. Even at a young age, Urasawa saw the gulf between his work and that of a "real manga artist." He said that he could also identify manga that was "commercialized" and made just for the money, something he did not want to do. Thus he never thought of becoming a professional manga artist, and graduated from Meisei University with a degree in economics.

== Career ==
=== Debut and success: 1982–2009 ===
When Urasawa visited Shogakukan to apply for a business job, he decided to bring some manga he had drawn out of curiosity. An editor from Weekly Shōnen Sunday did not give him the time of day, but the head editor of Big Comic Original happened to walk by and felt the work was better suited for Big Comic Spirits, and took Urasawa to their editorial department. He ended up submitting manga for their 1982 New Manga Artist Award, which his unpublished work "Return" won. It was only then that he thought about becoming a professional manga artist. It was a year after winning the award that Urasawa met Takashi Nagasaki, who would become his longtime editor and collaborator.

After working as an assistant for Toshio Nobe, Urasawa made his professional debut in 1983 with "Beta!", which was published in a special issue of Golgo 13. He then created the short serialized work Dancing Policeman the following year. Urasawa began his first major serialized work, Pineapple Army, in 1985 in the semimonthly Big Comic Original. He was the illustrator of the series, while Kazuya Kudo was its writer. It ended in 1988 and was collected into eight tankōbon volumes. While working on Pineapple Army, Urasawa began Yawara! in the weekly Big Comic Spirits in 1986 which he wrote and illustrated himself. It earned him the 1989 Shogakukan Manga Award in the General category. That same year it was adapted into a live-action film and an anime television series. It ended in 1993 and was collected into 29 volumes.

When Pineapple Army ended, Urasawa began Master Keaton for Big Comic Original in November 1988. He illustrated it, while Hokusei Katsushika wrote it. It ended in August 1994 and was collected into 18 volumes. An anime television adaptation began in 1998, before finishing as an original video animation in 2000. Likewise when Yawara! ended, Urasawa began another solo series in Big Comic Spirits. Happy! ran from 1993 until 1999 and was collected into 23 volumes. It was adapted into two live-action television films in 2006.

Following Master Keaton's end, Urasawa began Monster in Big Comic Original in December 1994. It earned him the 1999 Tezuka Osamu Cultural Prize, and his second Shogakukan Manga Award in the General category in 2001. It ended in December 2001, was collected into 18 volumes, and adapted into an anime television series in 2004. Junot Díaz, Pulitzer Prize for Fiction winner, praised Monster and proclaimed "Urasawa is a national treasure in Japan." With Happy!'s ending, Urasawa began 20th Century Boys in Big Comic Spirits in 1999. It earned him the 2001 Kodansha Manga Award in the General category, and his third Shogakukan Manga Award in the General category in 2002. It ended in 2006 and was collected into 22 volumes. The story briefly continued as 21st Century Boys in 2007, which was collected into two volumes. 20th Century Boys was adapted into three live-action films, which were released in 2008 and 2009.

While working on 20th Century Boys, Urasawa began adapting "The Greatest Robot on Earth" story arc of Osamu Tezuka's Astro Boy into the series Pluto. It was serialized in Big Comic Original from September 9, 2003, to April 5, 2009, and collected into 8 volumes. It earned him his second Tezuka Osamu Cultural Prize. In 2008, Urasawa began working for Kodansha, serializing Billy Bat in Morning. It ran from October 16, 2008, to August 18, 2016, and was collected into 20 volumes. Also in 2008, Urasawa and Nagasaki took guest teaching posts at Nagoya Zokei University, where they taught "Modern Expression Course: Manga Classes" two to three times a year, although the class met every month. Initially planned for only five students, he agreed to expand it to fifteen in an effort to create more "real artists."

=== 2010–2019 ===
Oricon held a poll on the Mangaka that Changed the History of Manga in 2010, mangaka being the Japanese word for a manga artist, and Urasawa came in tenth. In 2011, Urasawa illustrated a picture book adaptation of Kosuke Hamada's story Red Oni Cries.

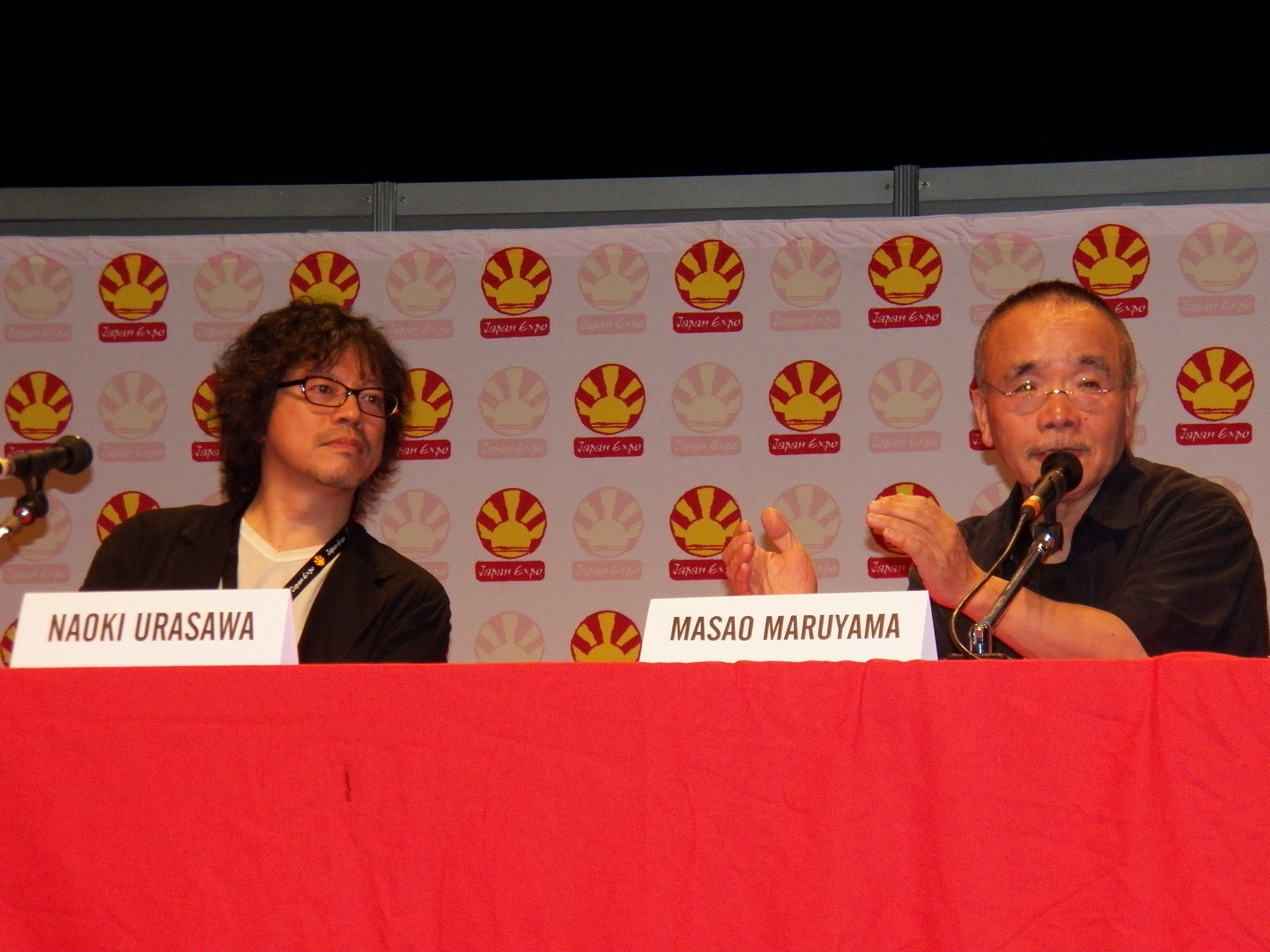
Urasawa and Masao Maruyama at Japan Expo 2012

Urasawa began writing a sequel to Master Keaton in 2012 titled Master Keaton Remaster. When asked why he went back to a series after so many years, Urasawa stated it was because with the original series he had a hard time making the story he wanted due to contractual obligation, and because people affected by the 2011 Tōhoku earthquake and tsunami said they had enjoyed the series, so he wanted to do something for them. Beginning in the March 2012 issue of Big Comic Original it finished in 2014 and was collected into a single volume. As a guest at the 2012 Japan Expo in France, Urasawa talked about how he entered the manga industry, gave a live drawing demonstration, and performed two songs as a musician, and joined rock band Hemenway on stage the following day.

Between 2013 and 2014, Urasawa contributed to the essay series "The Old Guys" that was published in Shueisha's Jump X magazine. His contributions and those of the other 32 writers who participated were collected into a July 2015 volume of the same name. In August 2013, Urasawa created his first "monster manga" titled "Kaiju Kingdom", a 41-page one-shot published in Big Comic. Urasawa is the host of the NHK Educational TV documentary series Urasawa Naoki no Manben, which focuses on a different manga artist each episode and explores their individual styles. He coined the word "manben" from his childhood; his parents and grandparents used to tell him, "Don't draw manga all day! You need to benkyō (study), too!" It began as a one-off special in November 2014, a first season was launched in September 2015, a second in March 2016, a third in September 2016, and a fourth in March 2017. After three years, the show returned in October 2020 with Neo added to the end of its title. The show won the December 2015 Planning Award as part of Quick Japan's annual TV of the Year awards, decided by broadcast writers. The June 9, 2021, episode on Yoshikazu Yasuhiko won the Grand Prize in the entertainment category at the 2022 Japan Media Arts Festival. Beginning in July 2015, Urasawa started contributing to the "Musica Nostra" column series that was published in Shueisha's Grand Jump magazine.

An art exhibition of Urasawa's work was on display in Tokyo from January 16 to March 31, 2016, before moving to Osaka from November 26 to January 25, 2017. It included illustrations, manga manuscripts, story notes, and childhood manga. Urasawa contributed a short, full color, left-to-right manga titled "Tanshin Funin/Solo Mission" to the February 2016 French comics anthology The Tipping Point to commemorate publisher Humanoids' 40th anniversary. Re-titled Turning Point, the anthology was published in Japan in September 2017. He created a short three-page manga about 1960s British rock band the Beatles time-traveling to 2016. Released in June 2016 on the website of Tokyo radio station InterFM897, it coincides with the TV program KKBOX Here comes The Beatles and celebrates the 50th anniversary of the band's visit to Japan.

On April 9, 2017, Urasawa began co-hosting a radio program with actor and comedian Junji Takada. Junji and Naoki airs Sundays at 5 pm on Nippon Cultural Broadcasting and features both men talking about their lives, professions, and favorite hobbies. That year Urasawa also began the limited series Mujirushi: The Sign of Dreams in a collaboration with France's Louvre Museum. It began in Big Comic Original in October 2017 and ended on February 20, 2018.

In January 2018, Urasawa attended the 45th Angoulême International Comics Festival in France, where he received the Fauve Special Award and the Fauve Polar SNCF Special Award for mystery. The festival also held an art exhibit of his work, before it moved to Paris from February 13 to March 31. Urasawa was the subject of the June 23 Wowow Prime TV program Nonfiction W Urasawa Naoki ~Tensai Mangaka no Owaranai Tabi~, which followed him around Europe, including to the 2018 Angoulême International Comics Festival and meeting Klaus Voormann in Germany. Urasawa began Asadora! in Big Comic Spirits on October 6, 2018. South Korean film director Bong Joon-ho called Urasawa "the greatest storyteller of our time" and likened the experience of reading Asadora! to that of being able to go back and read 20th Century Boys for the first time again. The November 2018 issue of Monthly Big Comic Spirits, released on September 27, was given the special title "Urasawa Jack". It included Urasawa's one-shot "It's a Beautiful Day", which adapted a story told to him by musician Kenji Endo, an interview between him and Shigeru Izumiya, and a calendar featuring illustrations of "beautiful women" by the artist. On December 27, Urasawa co-hosted a special radio program about Osamu Tezuka alongside Chiaki Kuriyama for Nippon Cultural Broadcasting.

In 2019, he designed the official posters of the 2019 Osaka Women's Marathon and a classic car charity event organized by Toshiaki Karasawa for reconstruction after the 2011 Tōhoku earthquake and tsunami. On January 23, 2019, Japan House Los Angeles presented the first North American exhibit of Urasawa's work, titled "This is MANGA – the Art of NAOKI URASAWA". The exhibit ran until March 28, 2019, and featured more than 400 original drawings and storyboards. Urasawa participated in an artist discussion and book signing on opening day. The exhibit moved to Japan House London from June 5 to July 28, also attended by the artist. Urasawa was a 2019 nominee for entry into the Will Eisner Hall of Fame.

=== 2020–present ===
In 2020, Urasawa drew advertisements for the Samsonite Red luggage brand, and was chosen to create one of the official posters for the 2020 Summer Olympics. For the second year in a row, he drew the poster for the Osaka Women's Marathon. In June, Urasawa created the cover portrait for Universal Japan's 250th anniversary release of music by Ludwig van Beethoven. He also appears in July 2020's ZK/Zunō Keisatsu 50 Mirai e no Kodō, a documentary film about the rock band Zunō Keisatsu. Urasawa directed and illustrated the music video, and illustrated the cover art, for Kazuyoshi Saito's March 2021 digital single "Boy". In November 2021, Urasawa's first one-shot for Shueisha, "Dr. Toguro Dokuro no Saigo", was published in Grand Jump to celebrate the magazine's 10th anniversary. By December 2021, his various works had over 140 million copies in circulation worldwide. He had an acting role in the December 2022 film The Flower in the Sky, portraying poet Haruo Satō. Urasawa served as a "creative partner" on La Panthere de Cartier, a 2025 anime produced by the French brand Cartier and animated by Production I.G.

== Style ==
An illustration by Urasawa depicting many characters from his oeuvre. Critics have praised his characters for their facial expressions and for being independently recognizable.

Fusanosuke Natsume said that prior to entering university, Urasawa's style showed influence from Shinji Nagashima and Osamu Tezuka's 1970s work, but went on to claim that in 1979 it became aligned with that of Katsuhiro Otomo. Due to his skill at structuring panel layouts, Kazuhiko Torishima cited Urasawa as the true successor to Tezuka. When talking in 1997 about the future of manga, Urasawa opined that "Tezuka created the form that exists today, then caricatures appeared next, and comics changed again when Katsuhiro Otomo came on the scene. I don't think there's any room left for further changes." He has also expressed admiration for French bande dessinée artist Moebius and American novelist Stephen King. Although Urasawa's works like Yawara! had light entertainment with cute young girls, Natsume says Urasawa developed his own personal style with Monster, which he described as realistic, or directorially based, with cinematic panel layouts similar to Otomo and gekiga artists. Natsume also noted that many of his characters resemble famous movie stars. Urasawa himself described his approach to manga as similar to storyboarding a movie, and acknowledged his work as adult-oriented, stating that even as a child he never liked manga aimed at children. However, he noted that he and Otomo both prefer to have their work called manga and not gekiga.

When asked where he gets ideas from, Urasawa said "I have been illustrating all my life. Inspiration is everywhere, when I get in the bath, when I get out. It's whether you are perceiving these ideas and whether you are able to catch them." He also said that he does not worry about what the readers want, and simply draws stories that he finds interesting. The artist said that while manga is often looked at as simple, he makes sure to use subtleties to show dramatic expressions and convey emotion, claiming "You won't find two expressions that are the same" in his work.

On his storytelling process, Urasawa states, "When I start a new project, I start with the larger arc of the story. I visualize a movie trailer for that story, and after I compose this movie trailer in my mind, there comes a point where I'm so excited about it that I have to write the story. And then I imagine, 'Where do I start to begin to tell this narrative?' and that's usually the first chapter." He does not plan the story out in advance, claiming that it tells him where it wants to go, and that if the story does not keep surprising even him, then he can not continue making it.

He also does not determine the page or panel layouts in advance. Having drawn manga for over five decades, he just follows his instincts, explaining "When I start to structure a story narratively, the question of tempo – developing a character moment-to-moment and then jumping to a two-page spread – how do you determine where that happens? It's like breathing to me – I know when it feels right."

For most of his career, Urasawa has written two different series simultaneously. With one of them being a weekly serialization and the other having a semimonthly schedule, Urasawa had six deadlines a month and said the only time off he had was when sleeping or eating. Urasawa frequently collaborates with manga editor and author Takashi Nagasaki, to the point where Nagasaki has been called his "producer." The two met when Nagasaki was made Urasawa's editor upon his debut. Although the two continue to collaborate even after Nagasaki became freelance, they rarely socialize outside of work. Urasawa said that following the anime adaptation of Yawara!, he has requested that he be able to check the scripts for any adaptation of his works. Until 2018's ongoing Asadora!, none of Urasawa's manga had ever been legally available in digital formats. The author stated that he prefers physical books. However, his earlier works began receiving digital releases in 2022, limited to Japan.

== Music ==
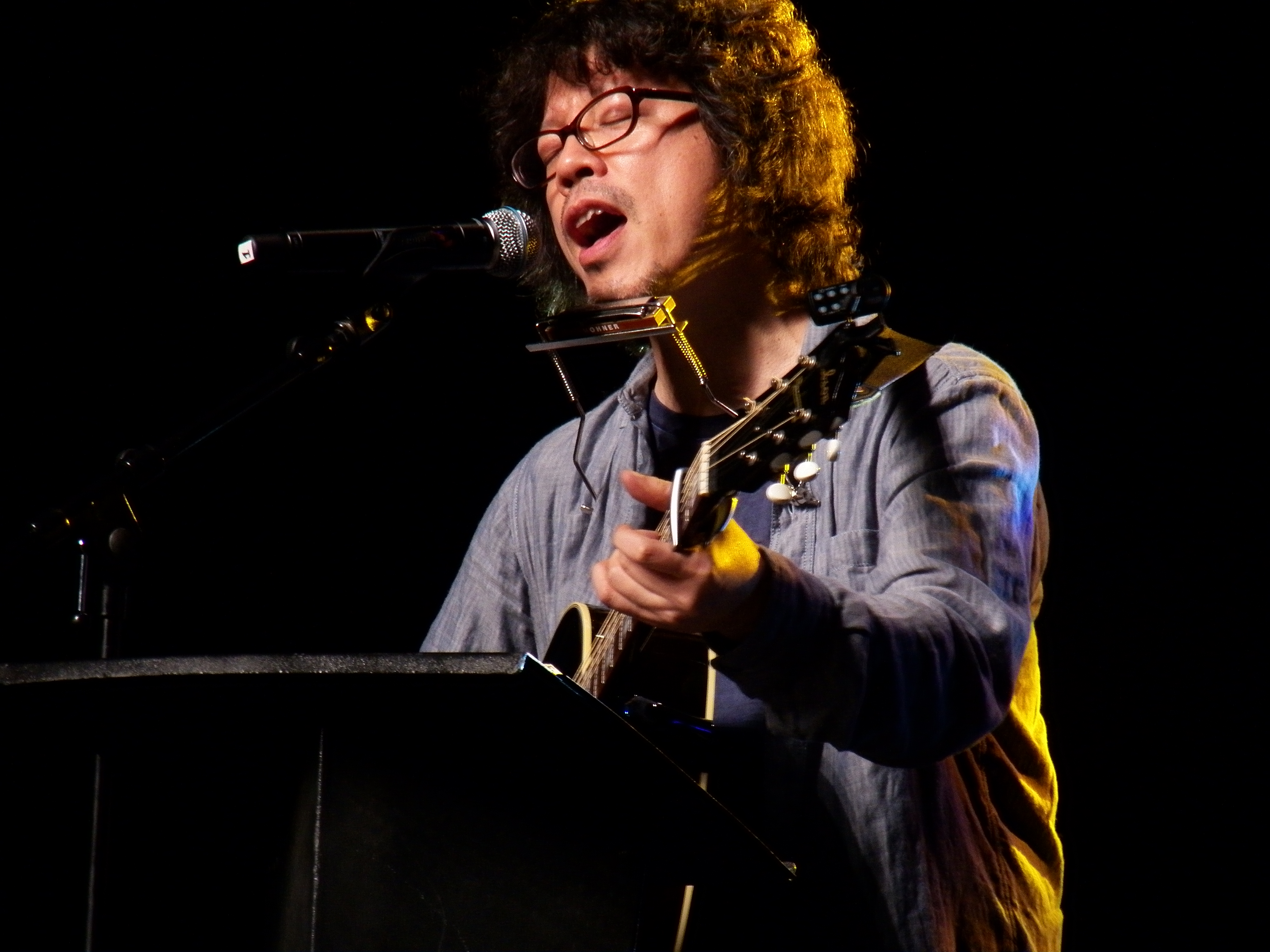
Urasawa performing live at the 2012 Japan Expo

Urasawa is also a musician. He stated "A lot of artists really struggled to decide whether to become manga artists or rock musicians, so the two are intertwined, they're synonymous!" Urasawa started playing guitar in junior high school inspired by folk rock singer-songwriters Takuro Yoshida and Bob Dylan.

Urasawa wrote and performed the song "Bob Lennon (Kenji no Uta)" (Bob Lennon (ケンヂの歌)), which was released on a CD included in the 2002 first pressing of volume 11 of 20th Century Boys. He released the limited single "Tsuki ga Tottemo..." (月がとっても...) on June 4, 2008, and his debut album Hanseiki no Otoko (半世紀の男; 'Half Century Man') on November 29, 2008. Both were produced by Koji Wakui, while the album features Hiroyuki Namba and other musicians. A single featuring a remix of T. Rex's "20th Century Boy" and Urasawa's "Bob Lennon (Kenji no Uta)" was released on August 19, 2009. Urasawa and Mitsuru Kuramoto wrote and performed "Nigero" (逃げろ) under the name Urasawa ni Mitsuru (浦沢に美津留) to be the theme of the 2011 NTT Docomo TV show Tsubuyaki Sanshirō ~Ippon Nau!~. In 2012 he performed a Japanese cover of Bob Dylan's "Girl from the North Country" and "Guta Lala Suda Lala" from his series 20th Century Boys at the Japan Expo, and the following day he joined rock band Hemenway on stage.

Urasawa's second album, Mannon (漫音) which he wrote and produced himself, was released in 2016. Urasawa wrote a demo for a song titled "Kanashiki LA Tengoku" (悲しきLA天国) and sent it to musician Mike Viola, who finished the track and invited Urasawa to Los Angeles to play on it. The people playing on the song are Urasawa, Viola, drummer Jim Keltner, and Mitsuru Kuramoto. It is included on the album The Best of Mike Viola which was released on January 22, 2020, with the performance credited to Monaka. In 2020, Urasawa was one of many people who submitted lyrics that were adopted by Sunplaza Nakano-kun into a new version of Bakufu Slump's 1984 song "Murida! Ketteihan" (無理だ！決定盤). Urasawa's third album, Love Songs, was released on February 26, 2025. It includes a new version of "Manga Kaki no Ballad" (漫画描きのバラード), the theme song to his TV show Urasawa Naoki no Manben Neo, that features Tetsuya Komuro, "It's Because I Love You" from his manga series Asadora!, "Mr. Postman" featuring Lenny Castro, and "Rainbow Child" featuring Miu Sakamoto.

== Works ==
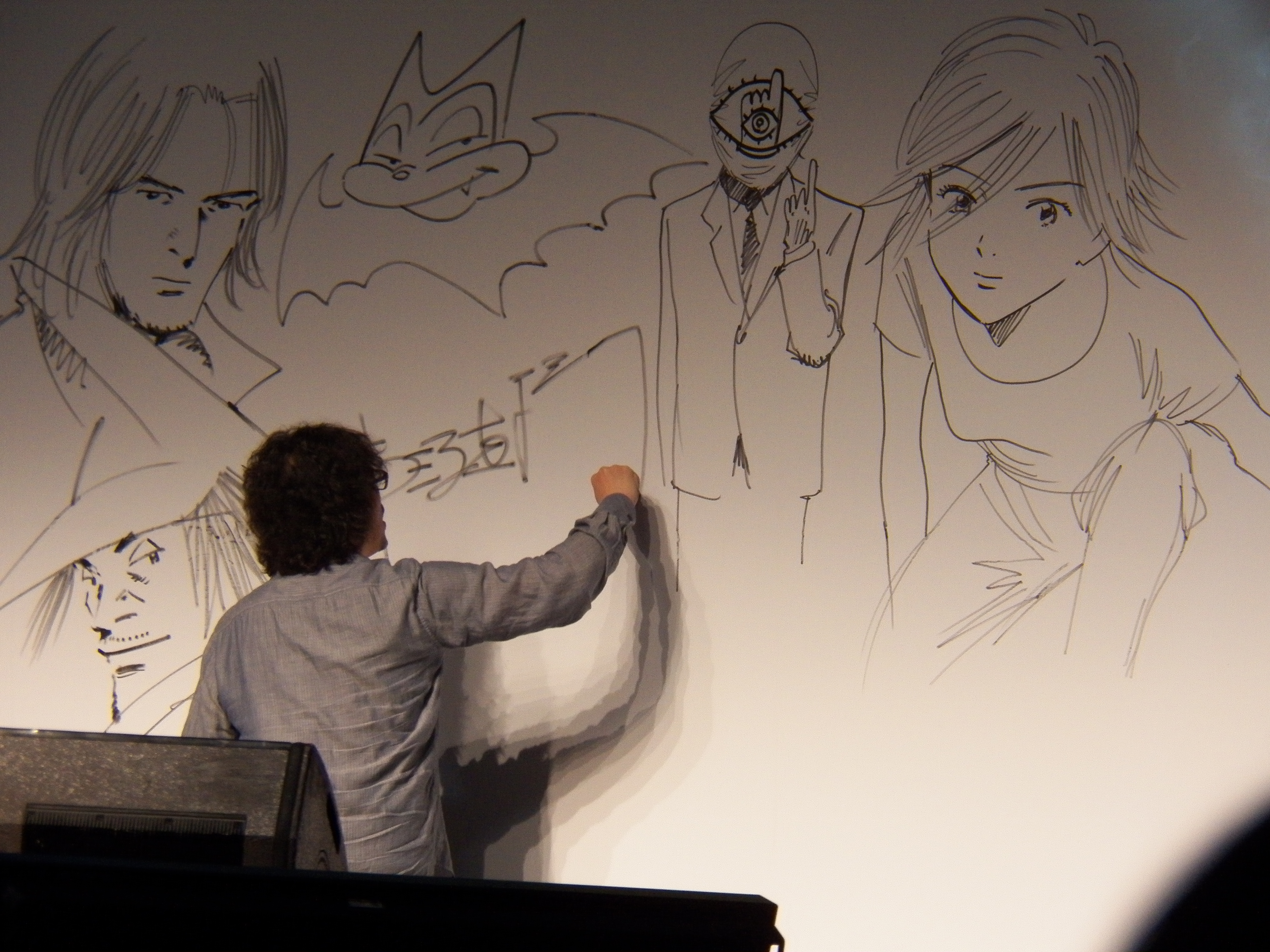
Urasawa live drawing in Paris

=== Serials ===
- Pineapple Army (パイナップルARMY; 1985–1988) – written by Kazuya Kudo
- Yawara! (1986–1993)
- Master Keaton (MASTERキートン, Masutā Kīton; 1988–1994) – written with Hokusei Katsushika and Takashi Nagasaki
- Happy! (1993–1999)
- Monster (1994–2001)
- 20th Century Boys (20世紀少年, Nijusseiki Shōnen; 1999–2006)
- Pluto (2003–2009) – written with Takashi Nagasaki, based on a work by Osamu Tezuka
- 21st Century Boys (21世紀少年, Nijūisseiki Shōnen; 2006–2007)
- Billy Bat (2008–2016) – written with Takashi Nagasaki
- Master Keaton Remaster (MASTERキートン Reマスター, Masutā Kīton Rimasutā; 2012–2014) – written with Takashi Nagasaki
- Mujirushi: The Sign of Dreams (夢印-MUJIRUSHI-; 2017–2018)
- Asadora! (連続漫画小説 あさドラ!, Renzoku Manga Shōsetsu Asadora!; "Serial Manga Novel Asadora!", 2018–present)

=== Other manga ===
- "Swimmers" (1979) – Unpublished until the May 13, 2003, issue of Evening.
- "Return" (1981)
- "Beta!!" (1983) – published in a special issue of Golgo 13
- Dancing Policeman (踊る警官, Odoru Keikan; 1984)
- N・A・S・A (1988)
- Jigoro! (1994) – includes the titular series, "Genroku Yarō" (元禄野郎) and "A Bat & 2 Balls"
- Early Urasawa (初期のURASAWA, Shoki no Urasawa; 2000)
- "Throw Toward the Moon!" (月に向かって投げろ!, Tsuki ni Mukatte Nagero!; 2006) – written with Takashi Nagasaki
- "Kaiju Kingdom" (怪獣王国, Kaijū Ōkoku; 2013)
- "Damiyan!" (ダミヤン; 2016)
- "It's a Beautiful Day" (いっつあびゅうてぃふるでい; 2018) – original draft by musician Kenji Endo
- Sneeze: Naoki Urasawa Story Collection (くしゃみ 浦沢直樹短編集, Kushami Urasawa Naoki Tanpenshū; 2019)
- "Dr. Toguro Dokuro no Saigo" (Dr.トグロドクロの最期; 2021)

=== Television, film, and radio ===
- 20th Century Boys: Beginning of the End (2008) – co-writer of the film's screenplay
- 20th Century Boys 2: The Last Hope (2009) – supervisor of the film's screenplay
- 20th Century Boys 3: Redemption (2009) – co-writer of the film's screenplay
- The Tibetan Dog (2011) – initial character designs
- Urasawa Naoki no Manben (浦沢直樹の漫勉; "Naoki Urasawa's Manga Exertions", 2014–2017) – host of the TV show
- Junji and Naoki (純次と直樹; 2017–present) – co-host of the radio show
- Nonfiction W Urasawa Naoki ~Tensai Mangaka no Owaranai Tabi~ (ノンフィクションW 浦沢直樹 ～天才漫画家の終わらない旅～; 2018) – as himself
- Seitan 90 Shūnen Kinen Tokuban ~Tezuka Osamu no Dengon~ (生誕90周年記念特番 ～手塚治虫の伝言～; 2018) – co-host of the radio special
- ZK/Zunō Keisatsu 50 Mirai e no Kodō (zk / 頭脳警察50 未来への鼓動; 2020) – as himself
- Urasawa Naoki no Manben Neo (2020–present) – host of the TV show
- "Boy" (2021) – directed and illustrated the Kazuyoshi Saito music video
- The Flower in the Sky (天上の花; 2022) – as Haruo Satō
- Mr. Moonlight ~1966 The Beatles Budōkan Kōen Min'na de Mita Yume~ (ミスタームーンライト～1966 ザ・ビートルズ武道館公演 みんなで見た夢～; 2023) – as himself, drew film poster
- "Monster" (2026) – directed and illustrated the Rodrigo y Gabriela music video

=== Other work ===
- Another Monster (2002) – novel written with Takashi Nagasaki
- Pleasure! (2003) – album cover for Domino88
- Wakui Sings Dylan (ディランを唄う, Diran o Utau; 2007) – album cover for Koji Wakui
- Talkin' About Bob Dylan (ディランを語ろう, Diran o Katarō; 2007) – book written with Koji Wakui, includes the manga "Bob Dylan's Great Adventure" (ボブ・ディランの大冒険, Bobu Diran no Dai Bōken)
- Manben (漫勉; 2008) – art book
- Tensai ka Jinsai ka: Izumiya Shigeru All Time Best (天才か人災か ～泉谷しげるオールタイムベスト～; 2010) – album cover for Shigeru Izumiya
- Gohan: Manzai Complete (『ご飯』～漫才コンプリート～; 2011) – DVD cover for Waraimeshi
- Pan: Warai no Shin Kyōchi (『パン』～笑いの新境地～; 2011) – DVD cover for Waraimeshi
- Red Oni Cries (泣いた赤鬼; 2011) – picture book of a Kosuke Hamada story, produced by Takashi Nagasaki
- Kyon 30: Nantettatte 30 Nen! (Kyon30～なんてったって30年！～; 2012) – one of the song selectors for Kyoko Koizumi
- Hinshi no Soroku Tonya (瀕死の双六問屋; 2012) – kanzenban edition book cover for Kiyoshiro Imawano
- "Be Hero" (2014) – single cover for Fudanjuku
- Urasawa Naoki Egaite Egaite Kaki Makuru (浦沢直樹 描いて描いて描きまくる; 2016) – guidebook
- Yano Pia (やのぴあ; 2016) – book cover for Akiko Yano
- "Boy" (2021) – single cover for Kazuyoshi Saito
- Jikkyō Rokuon Taizen Volume 11: 2015–2017 (実況録音大全[第十一巻]2015-2017; 2025) – album cover for Kenji Endo

== Awards and nominations ==
Awards and nominations received by Naoki Urasawa
Award	Year	Recipient(s) and nominee(s)	Category	Result	Ref.
Angoulême International Comics Festival	2004	20th Century Boys	Prize for a Series	Won	
Angoulême International Comics Festival	2011	Pluto	Intergenerational Award	Won	
Angoulême International Comics Festival	2018	Naoki Urasawa	Fauve Special Award	Won	
Angoulême International Comics Festival	2018	Naoki Urasawa	Fauve Polar SNCF Special Award	Won	
Angoulême International Comics Festival	2021	Asadora!	Youth Selection	Nominated	
Association des Critiques et des journalistes de Bande Dessinée	2010	Pluto	Prix Asie-ACBD	Won	
Eagle Awards	2012	20th Century Boys	Favourite New Manga	Won	
Eisner Awards	2007	Monster	Best U.S. Edition of International Material—Japan	Nominated	
Eisner Awards	2007	Monster	Best Continuing Series	Nominated	
Eisner Awards	2008	Monster	Best Continuing Series	Nominated	
Eisner Awards	2009	Monster	Best Continuing Series	Nominated	
Eisner Awards	2009	Monster	Best U.S. Edition of International Material—Japan	Nominated	
Eisner Awards	2010	Naoki Urasawa	Best Writer/Artist	Nominated	
Eisner Awards	2010	Pluto	Best U.S. Edition of International Material—Asia	Nominated	
Eisner Awards	2010	Pluto	Best Limited Series or Story Arc	Nominated	
Eisner Awards	2010	20th Century Boys	Best Continuing Series	Nominated	
Eisner Awards	2011	20th Century Boys	Best Continuing Series	Nominated	
Eisner Awards	2011	20th Century Boys	Best U.S. Edition of International Material—Asia	Won	
Eisner Awards	2011	Naoki Urasawa	Best Writer/Artist	Nominated	
Eisner Awards	2012	20th Century Boys	Best Continuing Series	Nominated	
Eisner Awards	2013	20th Century Boys	Best U.S. Edition of International Material—Asia	Won	
Eisner Awards	2015	Master Keaton	Best U.S. Edition of International Material—Asia	Nominated	
Eisner Awards	2016	Master Keaton	Best U.S. Edition of International Material—Asia	Nominated	
Eisner Awards	2019	Naoki Urasawa	Will Eisner Hall of Fame	Nominated	
Harvey Awards	2010	Pluto	Best American Edition of Foreign Material	Nominated	
Harvey Awards	2010	20th Century Boys	Best American Edition of Foreign Material	Nominated	
Harvey Awards	2013	20th Century Boys	Best American Edition of Foreign Material	Nominated	
Harvey Awards	2021	Asadora!	Best Manga	Nominated	
Harvey Awards	2026	Billy Bat	Best Manga	Won	
Haxtur Award	2004	Monster	Best Long Comic Strip	Won	
Haxtur Award	2004	Monster	Best Script	Nominated	
Japan Cartoonists Association Awards	2008	20th Century Boys and 21st Century Boys	Grand Prize	Won	
Japan Expo Awards	2006	Monster	Best Seinen	Won	
Japan Expo Awards	2006	Monster	Best Scenario	Won	
Japan Expo Awards	2007	Monster	Best Seinen (Audience Award)	Won	
Japan Expo Awards	2008	20th Century Boys	Grand Prix	Won	
Japan Expo Awards	2012	Naoki Urasawa	Honorary Award	Won	
Japan Expo Awards	2025	Pineapple Army	Best Scenario	Nominated	
Japan Media Arts Festival	1997	Monster	Excellence Prize	Won	
Japan Media Arts Festival	2002	20th Century Boys	Excellence Prize	Won	
Japan Media Arts Festival	2005	Pluto	Excellence Prize	Won	
Kodansha Manga Awards	2001	20th Century Boys	General	Won	
Lucca Comics Awards	2004	Monster	Best Series	Won	
Lucca Comics Awards	2010	Pluto	Best Series	Won	
Lucca Comics Awards	2012	Billy Bat	Best Series	Won	
Lucca Comics Awards	2021	Asadora!	Best Series	Won	
Max & Moritz Prize	2014	Billy Bat	Best International Comic	Won	
Max & Moritz Prize	2022	Naoki Urasawa	Lifetime Achievement Award	Won	
Seiun Awards	2008	20th Century Boys and 21st Century Boys	Best Comic	Won	
Seiun Awards	2010	Pluto	Best Comic	Won	
Shogakukan Manga Award	1989	Yawara!	General	Won	
Shogakukan Manga Award	2000	Monster	General	Won	
Shogakukan Manga Award	2002	20th Century Boys	General	Won	
Tezuka Osamu Cultural Prize	1999	Monster	Grand Prize	Won	
Tezuka Osamu Cultural Prize	2005	Pluto	Grand Prize	Won	
