= Zhao Jincai =

- 赵进才
- Born: December 1960 (age 65); Fengzhen, Inner Mongolia, China
- Education: Inner Mongolia University; Meisei University
- Scientific career
- Fields: Environmental chemistry
- Workplaces: Chinese Academy of Sciences

Zhao Jincai (Chinese: 赵进才; born December 1960) is a Chinese environmental chemist and researcher of the Institute of Chemistry of the Chinese Academy of Sciences. In April 1994, he obtained a doctorate from Meisei University in Japan. In 2011 he was elected as an academician of CAS. He is a professor at the Institute of Chemistry, CAS; Deputy Director of Key Laboratory of Photochemistry; Deputy Director of Science Committee of Molecular Sciences Centre, CAS. His research mainly focuses on the photocatalytic degradation of toxic and persistent organic pollutants. Zhao introduced TiO_{2}-based photocatalyst under visible light, and discovered a new way for oxygen atom transfer during photocatalytic reactions.

== Research ==
In the early 2000s, Zhao's group reported that visible light can accelerate the degradation of organic pollutants with aqueous solutions of iron tetrasulfophthalocyanine ([Fe(PcS)]) and H_{2}O_{2}. They also found out FeBR (Fe^{2+} complex of 2,2′-bipyridine) is efficient in eliminating organic pollutants such as rhodamine B (RhB), malachite green (MG) and N, N-dimethylaniline (DMA). They did several control experiments, in the dark or under irradiation, with or without irradiation. They proposed that when light is introduced, excitation of [Fe^{III}(PcS)] can result in electron transfer from ligand(L) to Fe^{3+}, then Fe^{3+} can be reduced to Fe^{2+}. The Fe^{2+}-L complex can react with H_{2}O_{2} to produce HO^{.}, leading to the degradation of pollutants.

== Contributions ==
Zhao has published over 200 papers in international journals and obtained 20 Chinese invention patents. Zhao won many awards:

2010 Japanese Photochemistry Association Lectureship Award for Asian and OceanianPhotochemist.

2005 The Second Grade National Prize of Natural Science of China (the first contributor).

2002 The Award of Excellent Young Scientists of Chinese Academy of Sciences- Bayer (Germany).

2002 The Fiste Grade Prize of Science and Technology in Beijing (Natural Science).

2002 The Second Grade Prize Military Science and Technique Progress Prize.

1999 Be selected into the first and second levels of "the National Hundred, Thousand and Ten Thousand Talent Project".

1998 The Special Contribution Award from the State Council of China.

1997 Distinguished Young Scientists of NSFC.

1999, 2002, 2006 The Award of Excellent Advisor of Graduates of CAS.
