= Pineapple Army =

Japanese manga series

- First tankōbon volume cover

パイナップルARMY (Painappuru Āmī)
- Genre: Action; Military
- Manga
- Written by: Kazuya Kudo
- Illustrated by: Naoki Urasawa
- Published by: Shogakukan
- English publisher: NA: Viz Media
- Magazine: Big Comic Original
- Original run: 1985 – 1988
- Volumes: 8

Pineapple Army (Japanese: パイナップルARMY, Hepburn: Painappuru Āmī) is a Japanese manga series written by Kazuya Kudo and illustrated by Naoki Urasawa. It was serialized in Shogakukan's magazine Big Comic Original from 1985 to 1988, with the individual chapters collected into eight tankōbon volumes. Viz Media licensed Pineapple Army for English release in North America in the early 1990s, but left it incomplete.

== Plot ==
The series stars Japanese-American Jed Goshi (ジェド・豪士), a former United States Marine who served in the Vietnam War. After leaving the marines he fought all over the world as a mercenary, before retiring in 1979. Now living in New York, he makes a living training others in combat. Goshi does not discriminate against those he trains, whether its Bengali militiamen, salarymen, or four little girls.

== Production ==
Pineapple Army is written by Kazuya Kudo and illustrated by Naoki Urasawa. Takashi Nagasaki came up with the premise of the manga, but Urasawa tried to add humor because he found it "difficult". It initially takes place in New York, but because the editor believed the magazine's main demographic was male, the setting changes to Europe at a certain point.

== Publication ==
Written by Kazuya Kudo and illustrated by Naoki Urasawa, Pineapple Army was serialized in the magazine Big Comic Original from 1985 to 1988. It is Urasawa's first major work and he would go on to draw Yawara! simultaneous with it. The individual chapters were collected into eight tankōbon volumes by Shōgakukan between March 29, 1986, and July 30, 1988. A six-volume bunkoban edition was published between November 17, 1995, and March 16, 1996.

In 1988, Viz Media began publishing Pineapple Army in English in a chapterly comic book format. These had new cover art drawn in a drastically different art style by an unknown artist. But the run was unsuccessful and cancelled after ten issues were released. Although, one graphic novel collecting them was also published with an afterword by James D. Hudnall. The manga is also licensed in France by Glénat, in Spain by Planeta DeAgostini Comics, and in Sweden by Epix Förlag.

=== Volume list ===
No.	Japanese release date	Japanese ISBN
1	March 29, 1986	4-09-181081-0
2	April 30, 1986	4-09-181082-9
3	October 30, 1986	4-09-181083-7
4	February 28, 1987	4-09-181084-5
5	May 30, 1987	4-09-181085-3
6	September 30, 1987	4-09-181086-1
7	May 30, 1988	4-09-181087-X
8	July 30, 1988	4-09-181088-8

== Reception ==
Manga critic Jason Thompson stated that Pineapple Army was a modest success in Japan, but failed in America. He speculated that Viz's decision to commission new covers by an unknown artist drawn in a "Dave McKean-style" might have been misleading when the reader opened them and saw little girls throwing hand grenades. In 2012, Thompson said that Pineapple Army was his least favorite Urasawa work available in English. While the art is good, he felt the artist had not developed his own style yet and showed too much of his Katsuhiro Otomo influence. Thompson largely compared it to Golgo 13 (which Kudo previously wrote for) with its self-contained mercenary stories, but stated that the chapters are much shorter and thus feel rushed. In France, Pineapple Army was nominated for Best Scenario at the 2025 Japan Expo Awards.
