= Mujirushi: The Sign of Dreams =

Japanese manga series

- Standard edition cover of the collected volume, featuring Kasumi

夢印
- Genre: Mystery
- Manga
- Written by: Naoki Urasawa
- Published by: Shogakukan
- English publisher: NA: Viz Media
- Magazine: Big Comic Original
- Original run: October 20, 2017 – February 20, 2018
- Volumes: 1
- icon

Mujirushi: The Sign of Dreams (Japanese: 夢印; French: Mujirushi – Le signe des rêves) is a Japanese manga series written and illustrated by Naoki Urasawa. It was serialized in Big Comic Original magazine from October 2017, to February 2018, with its chapters collected into a single volume by publisher Shōgakukan. It was licensed for English release in North America by Viz Media.

== Synopsis ==
Young businessman Kamoda, who owns a small factory making rubber products, decides to cheat on his taxes in order to save money to take his wife on a luxury cruise. After a surprise audit, his business goes under, and soon afterwards his wife walks out on him after winning a luxury cruise ticket in a lottery. After overhearing a conversation between two businessmen, he takes on an order to produce a large number of novelty rubber masks in the likeness of controversial US presidential candidate, Beverly Duncan. When Beverly wins in a landslide following a political scandal, however, the public loses interest, and Kamoda finds himself unable to sell any of the masks, leaving him with substantial debts.

On the verge of suicide, Kamoda and his daughter Kasumi are led by a crow and a mysterious symbol to a building called the "France Research Institute", where they meet the flamboyant Director, a Francophile who claims he can change Kamoda's fate with a daring painting heist at the Louvre Museum in Paris. The Director explains that he has always been fascinated by the work of artist Johannes Vermeer, in particular his painting "The Lacemaker", of which he has made a perfect forgery. He explains his plan to stage a theft of the real painting (which will in reality only be moved to a hidden location deep within the Louvre to be rediscovered at a later time) in order to pass the forgery off as the real thing and sell it on the black market for an extortionate sum. He also gives Kamoda a small stone with the aforementioned mysterious symbol carved into it, explaining that he took it from an ancient Egyptian statue years ago and wishes to return it to clear his conscience.

Despite Kasumi's reluctance, the two agree to the plan and head to Paris to meet up with a firefighter named Michel and his grandmother, both of whom know the Director through a mutual friend named Kyoko, who raised Michel as a child. While at first distrusting the two due to them not knowing Kyoko, he agrees to help them after Kasumi tells him of their plight.

In Japan, Mizoguchi, an aging detective on the verge of retirement, investigates the Director, believing him to be linked to a number of art smuggling cases over the last 20 years. Having followed Kamoda and Kasumi to the France Research Institute, he notifies Parisian authorities to keep a lookout for them. Meanwhile, a pair of journalists, after seeing a picture of Kamoda's wife spilling wine on a businessman on the luxury cruise, stumble onto a major corruption scandal involving Beverly Duncan, but fear for their lives too much to break the news.

Soon, the plan goes underway, with Kasumi and Michel staging a mock fire drill as a distraction while Kamoda hides the painting. Kasumi is given a vuvuzela, which she will blow as the signal for the mock drill to begin. Michel, believing the plan to be too risky, has his colleagues lock Kasumi in a back room while he attempts to find Kamoda and talk him out of it. When he finds out that the police are searching for the two, however, he changes his mind and triggers the mock fire drill himself, imitating the sound of the vuvuzela. The patrons of the Louvre all open bags that have been provided to them by Kasumi and Michel, each containing one of Kamoda's Beverly Duncan masks, and all don them. Following Kasumi's example, they all begin booing in unison.

With the crowd creating a distraction, Kasumi finds Kamoda, who has lost his nerve and finds himself unable to take the painting. The two of them escape without hiding the painting, although the Director's stone is successfully returned to the Egyptian statue. The Japanese reporters observe footage of the mock drill, and believing it to be an anti-Duncan protest, break news of the scandal to the press. This triggers an international wave of further anti-Duncan protest, and Kamoda's family is saved from financial ruin after his masks become highly sought after.

Six months later, Kasumi returns to France to meet Michel. Michel tells her a story of Kyoko's relationship with the Director, revealing that the stone was never actually part of the Egyptian statue to begin with, but was placed there at Kyoko's request as a symbol of their relationship.

After retiring, Mizoguchi discovers that the ringleader of the art smuggling cases he was looking for has been arrested by another department, and learns to his shock that it was not the Director. Stunned, he runs to the French Research Institute, only to discover the sign gone, the building abandoned, and the Director nowhere to be found. Defeated, he gives out a cry of "Sheeh!" – the Director's signature catchphrase.

== Production ==
About four years earlier, Naoki Urasawa was approached by the Louvre in France with a request to write a series. He could not immediately respond due to his work load at the time, but the project came to realization in 2017. Urasawa was given special access to areas of the Louvre usually unavailable to visitors, such as "the basement, attic and the museum at night". Mujirushi features the character Iyami from Fujio Akatsuka's classic comedy manga Osomatsu-kun. The series credits Akatsuka's Fujio Productions Ltd. with cooperation, while the Louvre is credited with "special cooperation."

In 2019, Urasawa stated that he had slight concerns about Mujirushi being published in English because "major animation or film studios could take offence, or maybe draw some non-existent similarities between my work and their work." He also said that there is a presidential candidate in the series who looks very similar to the then-president of the United States (Donald Trump) "for some strange reason, but I have no intention, that's not really how I wrote it!"

== Publication ==
External videos
- Promotional video for the series

Written and illustrated by Naoki Urasawa, Mujirushi was serialized in Big Comic Original from October 20, 2017, to February 20, 2018. Its chapters were collected and published into a single volume by publisher Shōgakukan on July 30, 2018. Two different editions were released, standard and deluxe, with the latter being the same size as the magazine run and including the color pages. In France, the series was published in two volumes by Futuropolis on August 23 and October 11, 2018, as part of their Musée du Louvre collection. They later published it in a single volume on June 26, 2019.

At New York Comic Con 2019, Viz Media announced that they licensed the manga for an English release in North America. They published the single volume under the Viz Signature imprint with the color pages on July 21, 2020.

=== Chapter list ===
No.	Original release date	Original ISBN	English release date	English ISBN
1	July 30, 2018	978-4-09-860042-7 (standard); 978-4-09-179258-7 (deluxe)	July 21, 2020	978-1-9747-1523-7
1er Sheeh!: "Research Institute"; 2ème Sheeh!: "City of Flowers"; 3ème Sheeh!: "A Single Painting; 4ème Sheeh!: "Round Stone"; 5ème Sheeh!: "Packages"; 6ème Sheeh!: "Maria"; 7ème Sheeh!: "Dragnet"; 8ème Sheeh!: "Vuvuzela"; Sheeh Final!: "Distant Dreams"

== Reception ==
According to Oricon, the Mujirushi collected volume sold 63,602 copies in its first week of release, and 114,489 by its third week.

Rebecca Silverman of Anime News Network reviewed the series as "part caper, part drama, and part theatre of the absurd" and "an impressive feat of storytelling". She commented that its various twists and turns could leave the reader lost until it all fully comes together at the end, which means it benefits from multiple readings. Mark Sammut of Comic Book Resources called Mujirushi a "peculiar but interesting read packed with timely social and political references, psychological drama, and traces of black humor." Reuben Baron from the same website titled his review, "Naoki Urasawa at his silliest" and wrote that it is not the author's greatest work, "having little in common with the series that made him famous beyond his recognizeable art style and interest in cross-cultural connections."

Although she called it "a warm and funny manga, teeming with Urasawa's signature style and skill", Morgana Santilli of Comics Beat praised the production over the plot: noting that "Though perhaps not as engrossing or complex as some of Urasawa's other offerings, Mujirushi does leave the reader with that familiar feeling of awe at a master's manipulation of line, panel, and story." Ian Wolf of Anime UK News gave the series a 9 out of 10 rating, noting that it has a thrilling story as is Urasawa's "trademark", but also elements of romance and humour. Reviewers noted the manga's thinly veiled political commentary and references to the 2016 United States presidential election with the character Beverly Duncan, whom Wolf called "someone with the face and attitude of Donald Trump, but the hairstyle and gender of Hillary Clinton".
