= Sneeze: Naoki Urasawa Story Collection =

Japanese manga anthology

- Cover, as published by Shogakukan

くしゃみ 浦沢直樹短編集 (Kushami Urasawa Naoki Tanpenshū)
- Genre: Comedy
- Manga
- Written by: Naoki Urasawa
- Published by: Shogakukan
- English publisher: NA: Viz Media
- Imprint: Big Comics
- Published: April 26, 2019
- Volumes: 1
- icon

Sneeze: Naoki Urasawa Story Collection (Japanese: くしゃみ 浦沢直樹短編集, Hepburn: Kushami Urasawa Naoki Tanpenshū) is a Japanese anthology of manga written and illustrated by Naoki Urasawa. It collects eight varied short stories that are loosely thematically linked, and which were originally published in various magazines and publications between 1995 and 2018. The single volume was released by Shogakukan in April 2019. Viz Media licensed it for English-language release in North America and published it in October 2020.

== Overview ==
"DAMIYAN!"
Published in 2016's 49th issue of Shogakukan's Weekly Big Comic Spirits. Yakuza Komoto is tasked by his superior to assassinate the family's new boss, believing him to be the one responsible for their previous boss's death. To do so, Komoto hires two odd young men to do it using one of the men's, Damiyan, supernatural abilities.
Urasawa said he could not remember why he chose Damiyan! as the title, but, because the title character has "666" on his shirt, speculated the idea must have come from the horror movie that has a character with a similar name. He vaguely remembers deciding to put the accent on "mi", Kansai dialect-style, instead of using the intonation heard in that film. He acknowledged that the title character looks like Yūki Himura from the Bananaman comedy duo, but said that must have been just a coincidence. Urasawa tried to include a variety of different serious themes before abruptly switching to the finished idea. He said he likes the story, even though it is "nonsensical."
"Throw Toward the Moon!"
Written with Takashi Nagasaki and published in The Asahi Shimbun Company's Aera Comic Nippon no Manga: Tezuka Osamu Cultural Prize 10th Anniversary Commemorative Mook in October 2006. Jesse has grown up to be a journalist just like a mysterious old man told him he would when he was a child, but has yet to win the Pulitzer Prize as also predicted. In fact, Jesse's career seems to be on the downturn instead, stuck writing obituaries for a no-name newspaper. When that same old man requests Jesse write his obituary for his upcoming death, Jesse learns he used to work with the FBI and begins investigating the one case the old psychic got wrong.
Because it was written to celebrate the 10th anniversary of the Tezuka Osamu Cultural Prize, which he had won twice for Monster and Pluto, "Throw Toward the Moon!" was going to be a collaboration between Urasawa and his Pluto co-author Takashi Nagasaki. But Urasawa thinks the two only had one intense meeting at a café, before he drew the rough layouts based on that one conversation. Urasawa suggested a piece about a newspaper obituary writer, and that set the plot in motion. Even though it is a dense story considering the number of pages, he said it has the distinct feel of a Urasawa-Nagasaki collaboration.
"The Old Guys"
Three two-page music-related stories published in Shueisha's Jump X in the May 2013, February and July 2014 issues. Urasawa muses about visiting a bar and trying to keep up playing guitar with an old guy who can play any folk song from the Shōwa era; attending a Paul McCartney concert alongside old guys who were singing along and crying tears of joy; and technical difficulties Bob Dylan faced during a concert that Urasawa attended.
"The Old Guys" and "Musica Nostra" were a part of a project by a group of manga artists centered around Katsuhiro Otomo. Because young moe characters were in fashion, the project was a "revolt" against that by depicting middle-aged men. Urasawa said he never expected that just a few years later there would be a social phenomena around things like "ossanzu love" (old guys' love) like there is now.
"Henry and Charles"
Published in the April 1995 issue of Fukuinkan Shoten's Okina Pocket. The mouse Henry tries to stop his dimwitted lackey Charles from traveling all the way around the countertop to acquire cake, worried he will accidentally wake up the sleeping cat on the floor.
A fan of American comedies like Looney Tunes (especially Tweety and Road Runner) and Bewitched since childhood, Urasawa created "Henry and Charles" with that sensibility in mind. It is in full color because it was for a children's magazine, which adds to the Western feel. He said it has a similar atmosphere to "Swimmers", a work he made before his debut about a cat and dog living in New York. Urasawa questioned if "Henry and Charles" could be his finest work.
"It's a Beautiful Day"
Original concept by musician Kenji Endo. Published in the November 2018 issue of Shogakukan's Monthly Big Comic Spirits. After a concert circa 1971, Kenji Endo, Yosui Inoue, Wataru Takada and the three members of Garo all visit a strip club where they watch a woman perform onstage with a large snake. The next morning, Endo, Inoue and Takada see the same woman pushing a baby stroller and note how the image bears a striking similarity to the cover of the self-titled album by the band It's a Beautiful Day.
Urasawa first heard this anecdote from Endo about ten years ago and was fascinated by the oddly beautiful and dramatic elements. Endo asked him to make it into a manga, but Urasawa was working on a serialization at the time and years passed. In June 2015, he contacted Endo and had him send a thoroughly detailed description via email. Endo died in October 2017. Urasawa finally made the manga in 2018, utilizing the story he heard, the email, and a printout Endo had left with his widow. He wrote an apology to Endo for being so late. Inspired by how Endo was a multi-instrumentalist, for the first time in a long while Urasawa did all the backgrounds, inking, erasing and screentones by himself. The sense of fulfillment this gave him, led to him doing a lot of the background work in Asadora! by himself. As such, he said Endo rekindled his enjoyment in making manga. Urasawa received permission from the musicians, and relatives of most of the dead musicians, to include them in the story. The cover of the album shown in the manga is identical to the It's a Beautiful Day's self-titled album.
"Musica Nostra"
Seven two-page music-related stories published in Shueisha's Grand Jump in the 15th and 23rd issues of 2015 and the 5th to 9th issues of 2017. They include Urasawa's musings about guitarists and playing guitar; his traveling to Sunset Sound in Los Angeles to record a song with Mike Viola and Jim Keltner, the latter of which sends a picture of Urasawa's The Beatles manga to Ringo Starr, and why their performance is credited to "Monaka"; Urasawa seeing Neil Young and Paul McCartney perform at Desert Trip; his meeting with Jack Oliver and depicting how the English record executive started working at Apple Records. "Musica Nostra" began with the belief that manga artists often listen to music while working, so the topic of music has universal appeal. But Urasawa said everyone was focused on drawing rather than listening, so the musical element never took off much. Despite that, he said it still really lifts his spirits to read the work.
"Kaiju Kingdom"
Published in 2013's 16th issue of Shogakukan's Big Comic. In a world where kaiju actually exist, French kaiju otaku Pierre travels to Tokyo hoping to see one in person. There he meets beautiful government scientist Misaki and together they learn why kaiju travel to and attack Tokyo every year since 1954, despite first appearing down in the southern islands. Urasawa wrote that he is of the "kaiju generation," and grew up watching them rather religiously. Even in early elementary school he was a tough critic, complaining about things like how there seemed to be an increase of battles at sea to save the costs of making city sets. He wrote that when a boy of that generation becomes an adult, "Kaiju Kingdom" is the type of manga he writes.
"Tanshin Funin/Solo Mission"
First published in Humanoids's The Tipping Point on February 16, 2016, in France, and later in Asuka Shinsha's The Turning Point on September 25, 2017, in Japan. A man argues with his wife about how he is being deployed to a dangerous planet for the safety of the universe. In Tokyo, he destroys a creature, but is then promptly stepped on by a human. "Tanshin Funin/Solo Mission" was created after receiving a request to contribute to an anthology commemorating the 40th anniversary of the founding of French publisher Humanoids. Because it was to be published in France, the work reads left-to-right instead of manga's usual right-to-left. Urasawa began working on the layouts assuming it would be simple to reverse the order of the panels, but found it harder than expected. Although there were topics assigned to the anthology, Urasawa said he completely ignored them and drew what he wanted.

== Publication ==
Sneeze: Naoki Urasawa Story Collection is an anthology collection of eight short stories by Naoki Urasawa. Shogakukan published the wideban volume under its Big Comics imprint on April 26, 2019. The book provides the definition of the word "sneeze" as "A sudden expiration of breath. A short work as opposed to a long work. It can make the most beautiful person look momentarily ugly." Rebecca Silverman of Anime News Network took this to metaphorically mean that each of the short stories included "is sudden, short, and challenges the idea of what is beautiful and ugly." While compiling the stories for the collection, Urasawa noticed that much of his work depicts things that he enjoyed as a child; kaiju, superheroes, and slapstick comedy. He was shocked at how little he has changed, but expressed gratitude to the culture of the 1960s and 1970s which has brought him so much inspiration for so long. In North America, Viz Media announced the English-language release of the volume in February 2020. The volume was published under the Viz Signature imprint on October 20, 2020.

=== Chapter list ===
No.	Original release date	Original ISBN	English release date	English ISBN
1	April 26, 2019	978-4-09-860338-1	October 20, 2020	978-1-9747-1748-4
1. "DAMIYAN!"; 2. "Throw Toward the Moon!" (月に向って投げろ！, Tsuki ni Mukatte Nagero!); 3. "The Old Guys" (親父衆, Oyaji Shū); 4. "Henry and Charles" (ヘンリーとチャールズ, Henrī to Chāruzu); 5. "It's a Beautiful Day" (いっつあびゅうてぃふるでい, Ittsu a Biyuutifuru Dei); 6. "Musica Nostra"; 7. "Kaiju Kingdom" (怪獣王国, Kaijū Ōkoku); 8. "Tanshin Funin/Solo Mission" (単身赴任 / Solo Mission, Tanshin Funin)

== Reception ==
Rebecca Silverman of Anime News Network ranked the volume as A−. She commended the stories featured in the collection, which despite being varied from each other are thematically linked. She cited "Kaiju Kingdom", "It's a Beautiful Day", and "Throw Toward the Moon!" as the best. Silverman concluded: "Sneeze as a collection is an interesting read. Its pieces are more linked than not in their themes and plots, but each also feels unique, so that it never feels like reading a retread. Whether you've read Naoki Urasawa's work before or not, this solid short story collection is nothing to Sneeze at".

Reuben Baron of Comic Book Resources felt that the stories in the collection "tend to showcase Urasawa's lighter, more humorous side." He also noted how "The Old Guys" and "Musica Nostra" are more like illustrated diary entries rather than full stories. Baron finished by saying those looking for complex storytelling might find most of the book underwhelming, aside from the cleverness of "Throw Toward the Moon!" and "Kaiju Kingdom", but recommended it to those looking for "a fun and breezy read" and to those looking to see Urasawa's wider artistic sensibilities.

Comicon.com's James Ferguson was struck by the sheer variety of the stories included in Sneeze and noted that they all have a positive vibe to them, even when the plot takes a dark turn. He was riveted by every story, even the ones about Urasawa's real life. Ferguson cited either "Kaiju Kingdom" or "Tanshin Funin/Solo Mission" as his favorites, the latter for "putting an interesting twist on super heroes fighting alien creatures."

Publishers Weekly called the content of the collection diverse, but still described most of the fiction as dealing with monsters and the supernatural, while the nonfiction centers on Urasawa's love for folk rock idols. They called "Kaiju Kingdom" a "nuanced allegory for how the West fetishizes Asian cultures," but accused "It's a Beautiful Day" and "the lecherous (if unintentionally)" "Musica Nostra" of paternalism despite the two being engaging and technically sound. They finished by calling Urasawa's "emotive art" and clever humor "unparalleled within the genre."

Ian Wolf of Anime UK News gave the volume a 9 out of 10 rating. He wrote that Sneeze has a lot in it to appeal to many different fans, but called its structure "strange", saying, for example: "the child-friendly comedic short about two cartoon mice is followed by a period music-based story which features nudity". Wolf said that the music stories are particularly interesting pieces for including some of the most famous music stars of modern times; "Not just the Fab Four, but Bob Dylan and Neil Young also appear during the course of this book, so if you are a big music lover, this is a manga to get". Wolf concluded: "Each of the stories comes with a commentary from Urasawa himself, and it is also nice to see two of these stories being coloured entirely.…For this and many other reasons, Sneeze is one of the best short story manga collections I have come across".

Reviewing the English release of The Tipping Point anthology, which is where "Tanshin Funin/Solo Mission" was first published, John Seven of Comics Beat wrote that Urasawa's story "sets up a comedic space adventure against the backdrop of family expenses, but the punchline fizzles."
