= Hemenway (band) =

Japanese rock band

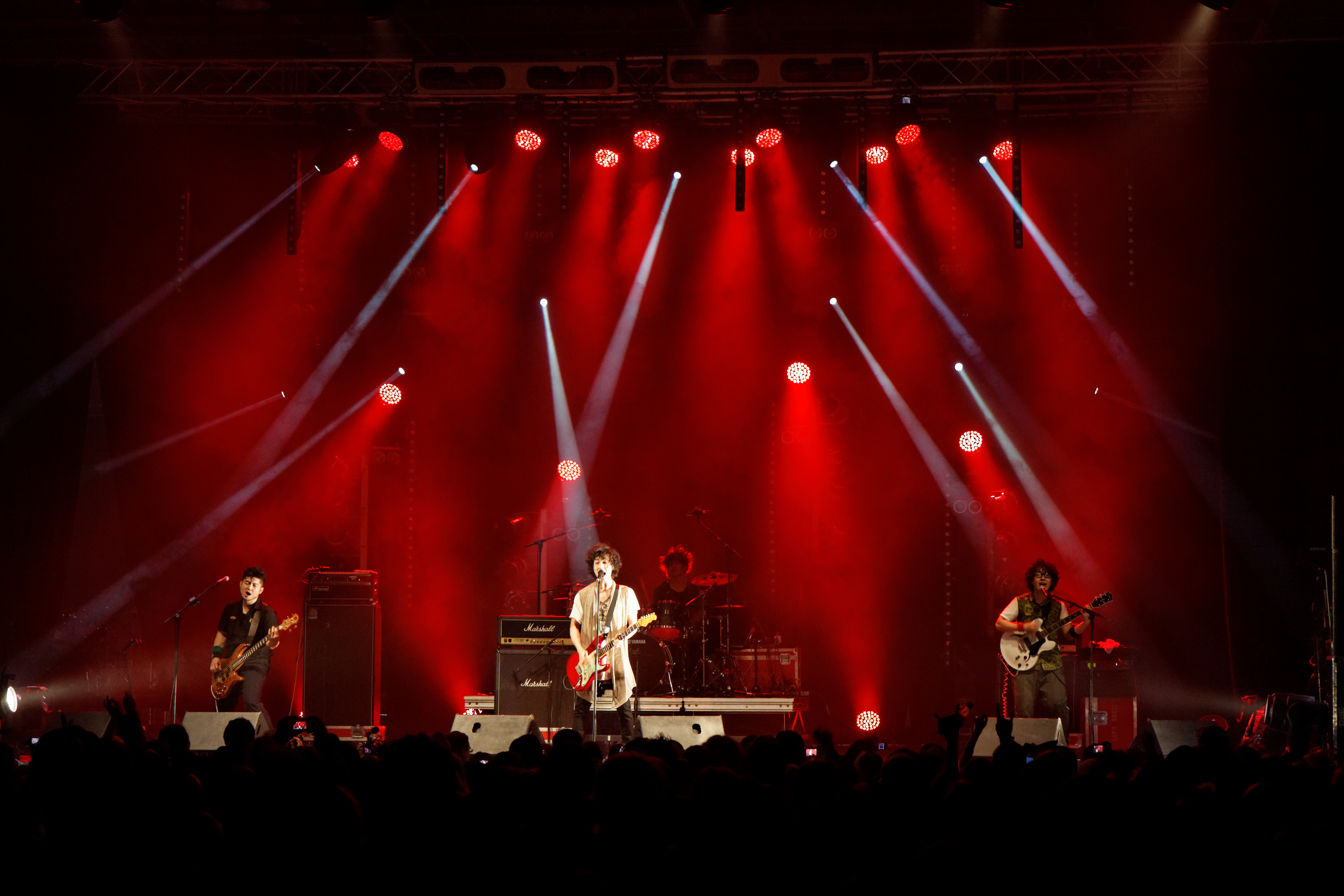

Background information
- Also known as: ヘメンウェイ
- Genres: J-Pop, rock
- Years active: 2011–2014
- Labels: Ki/oon Music
- Members: Isaac (Vocal, guitar); Charm (Guitar); Ogaching (Bass); Toshi (Drums)
- Website: hemenway.jp

Hemenway was a Japanese rock band formed in 2011 by Korean-Americans Isaac and Charm, along with Toshi and Ogaching who are Japanese natives. The members originally met at Berklee College of Music in Boston, Massachusetts in 2008 before forming the band. Isaac, the band's vocalist, speaks English, Korean and Japanese, and many of their songs feature lyrics in all three languages.

Hemenway provided the 20th ending to the Japanese anime Naruto Shippūden, the first opening theme to the anime Eureka Seven AO, and the opening theme to the anime Duel Masters Victory V3. Their single for Eureka Seven AO, "Escape", placed on the Oricon sales charts 5 times, peaking at 34th place.

On March 24, 2014, Hemenway announced the band's departure due to musical creative differences between the band members.

== See also ==
- THE RiCECOOKERS - another Japanese rock band formed of Berklee alumni
- Naoki Urasawa - Japanese manga artist and musician who collaborated with Hemenway on a live show at Japan Expo 2012
