= Billy Bat =

Japanese manga series

- First tankōbon volume cover, featuring Kevin Yamagata
- Genre: Conspiracy thriller; Mystery; Science fiction
- Manga
- Written by: Naoki Urasawa; Takashi Nagasaki
- Illustrated by: Naoki Urasawa
- Published by: Kodansha
- English publisher: NA: Abrams ComicArts
- Imprint: Morning KC
- Magazine: Morning
- Original run: October 16, 2008 – August 18, 2016
- Volumes: 20
- icon

Billy Bat (stylized in all caps) is a Japanese manga series written by Naoki Urasawa and Takashi Nagasaki and illustrated by Urasawa. It was serialized in Kodansha's weekly seinen manga magazine Morning from October 2008 to August 2016, with its chapters collected into 20 tankōbon volumes. The story follows the comic book artist Kevin Yamagata as he draws the popular detective series "Billy Bat". When he learns he may have unconsciously copied the character from an image he saw while serving in occupied Japan, he returns to Japan to get permission to use it from its original creator. Upon arriving there, however, he becomes embroiled in a web of murder, cover-ups, and prophecy that all leads back to Billy Bat. The manga has been licensed for English release in North America by Abrams ComicArts.

Billy Bat won the 2012 Lucca Comics Award for Best Series, the 2014 Max & Moritz Prize for Best International Comic, the 2026 American Manga Award for Best New Manga, and the 2026 Harvey Award for Best Manga.

== Premise ==
The story begins in 1949 and follows Japanese-American comic book artist Kevin Yamagata, who creates the popular funny animal detective series Billy Bat. After learning that he may have unconsciously copied the character from an image he saw while in occupied Japan, he returns there to get permission to use the character from its original creator. In Japan, he becomes embroiled in a web of murder, cover-ups, and prophecy that all leads back to the image of a bat. The truth is far larger than Kevin could ever have guessed, spanning across millennia and the world.

== Characters ==
=== Main characters ===
- Kevin Yamagata (ケヴィン・ヤマガタ, Kevin Yamagata): Kevin Yamagata is the first protagonist of the story in 1949. He is a nisei Japanese-American comic book artist drawing the popular detective series Billy Bat. When he learns he may have unconsciously copied the character from an image he saw while serving in occupied Japan, he returns to Japan to get permission to use Billy Bat from its original creator. Kevin's comics mostly feature anthropomorphized animal characters, such as dogs or mice. Later on, his Billy Bat comics become a kind of prophecy, its various plotlines precisely predicting future world events. Kevin's Japanese name is Kinji Yamagata (山縣 金持, Yamagata Kinji). He is said by others to resemble actor Ryō Ikebe in both looks and personality. He was born and raised in Orange County, California on November 26, 1923, while his parents were both originally from Niigata.
- Jacky Momochi (ジャッキー・モモチ, Jakkī Momochi): A nisei Japanese-American University girl in New York who was unwittingly influenced by Billy Bat. She is the descendant of the Momochi Clan of Iga-ryū. She later goes to Japan to uncover the truth about Francis Xavier's first Japanese disciple, Yajirō.
- Kevin Goodman (ケヴィン・グッドマン, Kevin Guddoman): Tony and Diane's little son and the second protagonist of this story. He plays a role in JFK assassination, where he was saved by Kevin Yamagata from being shot. As a result of Yamagata's actions, the assassin's bullet hit and killed JFK instead. Like other characters, the boy can also see the Bat and his scribblings reveal insight into the future JFK Assassination and the Momochi Clan's connection to the Scroll. He eventually grew up and his adventure begins in 1981 during his days as a university student of Princeton, New Jersey.
- Agent Smith (スミス, Sumisu): A mysterious man who claims to work for the CIA, and is investigating the Shimoyama incident. He helps Kevin investigate the myth of the Bat. While trying to save Kevin from an unknown assassin, he disappears. He reappears in 1981, elderly, and missing his left eye, saving Kevin Goodman from a fake police officer that was about to shoot Kevin.
- Kiyoshi Kurusu (来栖 清志, Kurusu Kiyoshi): A mysterious character working for a company called East Asian Industries. He is Finney's rival in the search for the legendary Scroll of Momochi. He and Finney presumably are the masterminds behind both the Shimoyama incident and the JFK Assassination, though it is later clarified they both work for rival organizations who want the scroll for themselves. In Zōfū's manga, he makes an appearance as the character Karate Chop Man. He is seen again in 1981, with even Billy Bat mentioning he is unsure of Kurusu's full role in the scheme of things. It revealed Kiyoshi once meet Zofu as a child after the death of his father.
- Captain Finney (フィニー大尉, Finī Taii): A portly, pale-eyed man who claims to work with the GHQ Special Investigation Unit. He and Kurusu are searching for the Scroll of Momochi. By the 1960s, he has apparently begun working for the fake Chuck Culkin.
- Timmy Charles Sanada (ティミー・チャールズ・サナダ, Timī Chāruzu Sanada): The illegitimate son of the fake Chuck Culkin, and chose by Kevin Goodman to be his successor. It is later revealed the "voice" he hears isn't Billy, but the delusions of his father, guiding him to the end of the world. He soon usurps control of Chuck Culkin Enterprises.
- Billy Bat (ビリーバット, Birī Batto): Ostensibly, a talking anthropomorphic bat that is the star of several detective comic book series throughout the 20th Century. His true nature and purpose comprise the central mystery of the plot. Francis Xavier himself once mentioned the Bat, unsure if the entity was an angel, demon or perhaps both. Zōfū, on the other hands, claims there are two bats, one white and the other black. When The White Bat appears, it always says confusing things, and when The Black Bat appears, it manipulates people to do bad things; however, Albert Einstein later states that the White Bat is not to be trusted, and will destroy all who it "helps".

=== Secondary characters ===
- Chuck Culkin (チャック・カルキン, Chakku Karukin): Kevin Yamagata's assistant in 1949. He was left in charge of drawing the Billy Bat series when Kevin left for Japan.
- "Chuck Culkin" (「チャック・カルキン」, "Chakku Karukin"): An imposter who has taken on the public persona of Chuck Culkin, and is the head of Chuck Culkin Enterprises, the company that owns the rights to Billy Bat. He has the real Chuck Culkin cooped up in his mansion, producing new Billy Bat comics that prove explosively popular. He bears similarity to Walt Disney, both in appearance and personality. A former Nazi soldier, he was personally tasked with traveling to the United States and popularizing the image of Billy Bat by Adolf Hitler.
- Charlie Ishizuka (チャーリー・イシヅカ, Chārī Ishizuka): A Japanese man who works for GHQ, acting as an interpreter for L.T. Colonel Chagnon of the Civil Transportation Section (CTS) who was Kevin's longtime friend. He owned a copy of the Scroll made by Hattori Hanzo, but after he is found dead the ancient text went missing.
- Shizuka (シヅカ, Shizuka): A Japanese prostitute who fell in love with Kevin and sheltered him when he was first pursued by Kurusu. She was injured as a result of the scuffle and was rendered unable to work for a time. When she finally did start working again, she was fatally wounded by someone she called the Karate Chop Man, and died in Kevin's arms.
- Zōfū Karama (唐麻 雑風, Karama Zōfū): A Japanese manga artist who has been drawing the Billy Bat character (in his "Boy Bat" incarnation) since the Taishō period. Bears similarity to Shichima Sakai, the mentor of Osamu Tezuka.
- Tony and Diane Goodman (トニーとダイアン・グッドマン, Tonī to Daian Guddoman): A married mixed-race American couple. Tony is the caucasian heir to the Golden Cola Company, and Diane is a black worker at the facility Tony supervised. They fell in love, but the objections of both of their families forced Diane to run away from the wedding. During her flight, Diane rode a taxi driven by Randy Momochi, and their subsequent conversation convinced Diane not to give up on her marriage. Tony is a major fan of Kevin's version of the Billy Bat comics, and the couple named their first son Kevin as a result.
- Randy Momochi (ランディ・モモチ, Randi Momochi): An issei Japanese-American cabbie in New York, he helped reunite Tony and Diane on their wedding day. A fan of Kevin Yamagata's Billy Bat series, he is also Jacky Momochi's father. His Japanese name is Kinji Momochi (百地 金持, Momochi Kinji).
- Kanbei (勘兵衛): A ninja of the ancient province of Iga who served the Momochi Clan. When the land of Iga was attacked by Oda Nobunaga's army, he was ordered to bring the Scroll to Momochi Sandayū. To accomplish his mission, he was forced to kill his childhood friends. Later, he met the original owner of the scroll, Yajirō, Francis Xavier's disciple. Shortly afterward, Yajirō was killed, and out of remorse for the murders he committed, Kanbei decided to bury the Scroll in order to hide it from Momochi Sandayū.
- Henry Charles Devivie (ヘンリー・チャールズ・デヴィヴィ, Henrī Chāruzu Devivi): A mysterious man who wants to buy Koumori Village, the town where the Scroll is said to be located, in order to make a new Billy Bat theme park. His true goal, however, is to find the Scroll, and anyone he decides to negotiate with about the land soon ends up murdered.
- Kotarou Akechi (明智 浩太郎, Akechi Kōtarō): A famous Japanese movie director specializing in special effects and monster movies. Famous for his movie "Great Monster Gazura", the equivalent of Godzilla in the world of "Billy Bat". Likewise, his appearance is reminiscent of Ishirō Honda, the most famous director of the Godzilla franchise. He is summoned to America by Chuck Culkin Enterprises to direct a faked landing on the Moon.
- Shishou (師匠, Shishō) (Master): A lumbering Japanese American ex-con and artist who, like Kevin and Zōfū, predicted the future through his comic strips.
- Audrey Culkin (オードリー・カルキン, Ōdorī Karukin): The apparent daughter of the fake Chuck Culkin, she first appears as an "art dealer" trying to recruit Kevin Goodman.
- Maggie Momochi (マギー・モモチ, Magī Momochi): Jacky's daughter, she is an aspiring documentary filmmaker in 2017.

=== Historical figures ===
- Sadanori Shimoyama (下山 定則, Shimoyama Sadanori) (July 23, 1901 – July 5 or 6, 1949): Bureaucrat of Ministry of Transport (former Ministry of Railways), was appointed the first president of JNR when it was established on June 1, 1949. Under the Dodge Line policy of the government, Shimoyama was responsible for drastic personnel cutbacks of JNR, as a part of which on July 4, 1949, he released a list of about 30,000 employees to be fired. He died in an unsolved event known as the Shimoyama incident.
- Jirō Shirasu (白洲 次郎, Shirasu Jirō) (February 17, 1902 – November 28, 1985): Japanese diplomat and politician who served as interpreter and negotiator in the talks between the Japanese government and Douglas MacArthur's GHQ, on account of his education in Cambridge. In the manga, Shirasu is a mysterious character who helps Kevin in one occasion.
- Judas Iscariot (c. 3 AD – c. 30 to 33 AD): One of the twelve apostles of Jesus Christ, best known for betraying Jesus. He sees Jesus heal someone, asks him if he was "the Anointed One", then asked him "if you've seen God before, what is his shape?". Jesus then drew the Billy Bat symbol.
- Francis Xavier (April 7, 1506 – December 3, 1552): Led an extensive mission into Asia. At age 10 he became the carrier of the "Ancient Text" until his death.
- Lee Harvey Oswald (October 18, 1939 – November 24, 1963): According to four government investigations, was responsible for the Kennedy assassination. Oswald has a large role in the manga.
- Fujibayashi Nagato-no-kami (藤林長門守): A ninja jonin active around the same time as Momochi Sandayu. He operated outside most of Momochi Sandayu's activities (in North Iga as opposed to Momochi in the South), and was almost equally feared. It is believed, though, that Momochi Sandayu and Fujibayahi Nagato were, in fact, the same person, as Momochi Sandayu was mentioned in a journal describing Oda Nobunaga's invasion of Iga province in 1581 for his courage and gallantry, but there is no mention of Fujibayashi Nagato.
- Hattori Hanzō (服部半蔵) (c. 1542 – January 2, 1597): Arguably the most famous ninja in history, the tales of Hattori Hanzō are still recounted in Japanese history texts. In the manga, he sends Gonosuke to kill Kanbei and retrieve the scroll. When Iga is attacked by Oda's army, he allowed Kanbei to bury the ancient scroll and chose not to kill him because he already made a copy of the ancient scroll and passes it to Akechi Mitsuhide.
- Oda Nobunaga (織田信長) (June 23, 1534 – June 21, 1582): In 1581, two years after a failed invasion led by his son, the warlord Oda Nobunaga launched a massive invasion of Iga, attacking from six directions with a force of 40,000 to 60,000 men. After ruthlessly slaughtering great numbers of the inhabitants of the Iga region, Oda Nobunaga then declared a cease-fire which allowed some of the Iga ninja to escape. It was, however, the end of the independent Iga Republic.
- George de Mohrenschildt (April 17, 1911 – March 29, 1977): A petroleum geologist and professor who befriended Lee Harvey Oswald in the summer of 1962 and maintained that friendship until Oswald's death. He had personal acquaintance with the Bouvier family, including Jacqueline Bouvier Kennedy, wife of the President of the United States, when she was still a child.
- John F. Kennedy (May 29, 1917 – November 22, 1963): The 35th President of the United States until his assassination on November 22, 1963. Many theories surround his violent death.
- Neil Armstrong (August 5, 1930 – August 25, 2012): The first person to set foot on the Moon. In the manga, he discovers the bat symbol after setting foot there.
- Albert Einstein (March 14, 1879 – April 18, 1955): A physicist, and the most famous scientist in history, most known for his general and special theories of relativity. In the manga, he meets Zofu Sensei in Japan in 1922 and thereafter can communicate with and learn from Billy Bat.
- Adolf Hitler (April 20, 1889 – April 30, 1945): The infamous leader of Nazi Germany prior to and during World War II. In the manga, he meets both Einstein and the false Chuck Culkin.

== Production ==
Longtime collaborators Naoki Urasawa and Takashi Nagasaki worked on story ideas for Billy Bat for four years. Nagasaki described the process by saying, "People often think he's the pitcher and I'm the catcher, but in our discussions for this story, I was the pitcher, he was the batter." One of the things they thought about when starting the series was the possibility of Billy Bat being like Jesus Christ with an ancient mystery around it. Nagasaki was also interested in the idea of having "the very first image of God that humans ever saw" being the Billy Bat symbol. Speaking on the mystery of the symbol, Urasawa said that "Human history is tied to that kind of thing [symbols], and it has always been the expression and source of culture. It has repeatedly brought out the good and evil in people and guides them in good and bad directions."

The postwar Japan setting of Billy Bat was partly inspired by David Peace's 2007 book Tokyo Year Zero. Nagasaki said that, Peace had "told the story of postwar Japan so well... as Japanese, we couldn't let an Englishman tell our story better than us. I was a bit perturbed by that." Believing that young Japanese people were ignorant about the period and that society had completely forgotten about it, Nagasaki and Urasawa wanted to focus on postwar Japan to show how the country rose after World War II. Urasawa said, "I don't expect people to use this manga to study history, but I do hope to draw some attention to that period." Another inspiration was the Shimoyama incident, which is referenced in the manga to highlight the instability of the era. Nagasaki said, "It remains a mystery in Japan whether it was suicide or murder. There even were rumors that either the communists or GHQ was behind it. But we don't know. And Japan rose from this sort of gloom."

Nagasaki speculated that Urasawa wanted to tell the story of Walt Disney with the series, but said he personally had no intention of doing so. In 2019, Urasawa stated that he had slight concerns about Billy Bat being published in English because "major animation or film studios could take offence, or maybe draw some non-existent similarities between my work and their work."

The first two chapters of the manga are drawn as the fictional Billy Bat American comic seen within the series, including being printed in full color with brown edges to mimic aging paper. Although they received negative reactions from readers on the internet, Urasawa believed that plenty others suspected it was a "gimmick" and that he would not continue it in that style. Urasawa explained, "I want to experiment with the freedom to switch back and forth between styles and storylines; I don't think too far ahead in the story; I want to see if I can get the readers to follow along with me. That way, I can maybe push things further."

== Publication ==
Written by Naoki Urasawa and Takashi Nagasaki and illustrated by Urasawa, Billy Bat was announced in issue 45 of Kodansha's seinen manga magazine Morning on October 9, 2008. It marks Urasawa's first major manga to be published by a company other than Shogakukan. Its first chapter was released in the next issue on October 16, 2008, and its last chapter was published on August 18, 2016. When Morning launched its digital counterpart, D Morning, in May 2013, Billy Bat was one of two series not included in the magazine's digital version. The series' 165 chapters were compiled into 20 tankōbon volumes by Kodansha between June 23, 2009, and September 23, 2016. Before the release of volume two, a 70 meter by 40 meter geoglyph of the Billy Bat symbol was found in the mountains of Iwafune, Tochigi. To commemorate the release of the 20th volume, Urasawa planned and directed a 60-second video, which he also performed the music for. The video features the Billy Bat symbol drawn on about 600 different surfaces like a flip book.

In August 2025, Abrams ComicArts announced that they had licensed the series for English publication under their Kana imprint, with the first volume released on June 2, 2026.

=== Volumes ===
No.	Original release date	Original ISBN	English release date	English ISBN
1	June 23, 2009	978-4-06-372812-5	June 2, 2026	979-8-88707-587-7
1. "Dreary Night Murders" (DREARY NIGHT MURDERS(やるせない夜の殺人)); 2. "A Sincere Night" (A SINCERE NIGHT(真実の夜)); 3. "Hunt for the Bat" (コウモリ探し, Kōmori Sagashi); 4. "Ancient Bat Text" (コウモリの古文書, Kōmori no Komonjo); 5. "Dead on the Tracks" (轢死体, Rekishi-tai); 6. "Black or White" (黒か白か, Kuro ka Shiro ka); 7. "The Mystery Begins" (迷宮のはじまり, Meikyū no Hajimari); 8. "Signs" (符号, Fugō); 9. "Batboy's Big Adventure, Part One" (こうもり小僧の大冒険 其ノ壱, Kōmori Kozō no Dai Bōken, Sonoichi)
2	November 20, 2009	978-4-06-372853-8	September 1, 2026	979-8-88707-594-5
10. "What Follows the Ending" (終わりの続き, Owari no Tsuzuki); 11. "Beginning of the Next Chapter" (続きのはじまり, Tsuzuki no Hajimari); 12. "Thousands upon Thousands of Suspects" (何万人の容疑者, Nanmannin no Yōgi-sha); 13. "A Burdensome Destiny" (背負わされた宿命, Seowasareta Shukumei); 14. "The Form the Lord Takes" (主の姿, Shu no Sugata); 15. "The Father? The Son? The Holy Spirit?" (父か子か聖霊か, Chichi ka Ko ka Seirei ka); 16. "Before the Church" (教会の前, Kyōkai no Mae); 17. "After the Church" (教会のあと, Kyōkai no Ato); 18. "Handbook of the Momochi Martial Arts, First Chapter" (百地武芸帖 一之巻, Momochi Bugei Jō, Ichinomaki)
3	March 23, 2010	978-4-06-372888-0	December 8, 2026	978-1-41978-018-9
4	July 23, 2010	978-4-06-372922-1	March 2, 2027	978-1-41978-019-6
5	November 22, 2010	978-4-06-372955-9	June 1, 2027	978-1-41978-020-2
6	May 23, 2011	978-4-06-387001-5	—	—
7	July 22, 2011	978-4-06-387037-4	—	—
8	February 23, 2012	978-4-06-387078-7	—	—
9	May 23, 2012	978-4-06-387109-8	—	—
10	September 21, 2012	978-4-06-387141-8	—	—
11	March 22, 2013	978-4-06-387196-8	—	—
12	August 23, 2013	978-4-06-387230-9	—	—
13	November 22, 2013	978-4-06-387272-9	—	—
14	April 23, 2014	978-4-06-388326-8	—	—
15	September 22, 2014	978-4-06-388360-2	—	—
16	March 23, 2015	978-4-06-388427-2	—	—
17	August 21, 2015	978-4-06-388487-6	—	—
18	December 22, 2015	978-4-06-388548-4	—	—
19	June 23, 2016	978-4-06-388609-2	—	—
20	September 23, 2016	978-4-06-388643-6	—	—

== Reception ==
Billy Bat won Best Series at the 2012 Lucca Comics Awards in Italy. The German release won the 2014 Max & Moritz Prize for Best International Comic. Kana's English release won Best New Manga at the third American Manga Awards on August 20, 2026, which is co-organized by Anime NYC and Japan Society. It won Best Manga at the 2026 Harvey Awards, which took place on October 9. In Japan, volume one was the fifth best-selling manga in its week of release, selling over 145,000 copies.

Cristoph Mark of Daily Yomiuri called the first two Dick Tracy-like chapters, which are drawn as the fictional Billy Bat comic seen in the series, "a refreshing change of pace" but noted how they were received negatively by fans on the internet. Speaking to Mark, Nagasaki opined, "When we were with [publisher] Shogakukan, I think our readers would've gone along with Urasawa's different style for Billy Bat. But since moving to Kodansha, I think we lost a bunch of readers with the first couple of stories. There are mangaka who want to do an American-style comic, but nobody has succeeded with doing it".

Anime News Network described Billy Bat as having an American noir influence with its hard-boiled detective comic and "the haunting ambiguity of the bat and of the subject matter". Due to it being about the act of writing, they compared it to Bakuman, but wrote that it utilizes the thriller format "so as to say something less conventional and more controversial". Anime News Network also noted how actions by characters in the story mirror the "ridiculous, creativity stifling" steps that The Walt Disney Company takes in regard to their own works. Mark Sammut of Comic Book Resources called Billy Bat a "fascinating manga that blends popular conspiracy theories and an engrossing mystery to craft a narrative that bends and twists seemingly every other page." He noted that the plot is "somewhat unfocused" over the course of its 165 chapters, but its first half is "incredibly strong and it has some great arcs".
