= Happy! (manga) =

Japanese manga series and adaptations

- First tankōbon volume cover, featuring Miyuki Umino
- Genre: Sports
- Manga
- Written by: Naoki Urasawa
- Published by: Shogakukan
- Magazine: Big Comic Spirits
- Original run: 1993 – 1999
- Volumes: 23
- Live-action television film
- Directed by: Osamu Katayama
- Written by: Hideo Tsuchida
- Released: April 7, 2006
- Runtime: 22 minutes
- Live-action television film

Happy! 2
- Directed by: Ryutaro Kawashima
- Written by: Hideo Tsuchida
- Released: December 26, 2006
- Runtime: 22 minutes
- icon

Happy! is a Japanese sports manga series written and illustrated by Naoki Urasawa. It was serialized in Big Comic Spirits from 1993 until 1999, with its 254 chapters collected into 23 tankōbon volumes by Shogakukan. The story follows a teenage heroine who embarks on a career as a professional tennis player to repay an enormous debt incurred by her brother to yakuza loan sharks, with the threat that if she fails, they will force her into a life of prostitution at a soapland.

The series was adapted into two television movies broadcast on TBS in 2006.

The Happy! manga series has over 18 million copies in circulation.

== Plot ==
Since the death of her parents, Miyuki Umino has been raising her brothers and sisters alone. One day, she receives a visit from two yakuza who ask her to reimburse a debt of 250 million yen contracted by her older brother, of whom she has no news. To escape prostitution, she left high school and decided to start a career as a professional tennis player. Gifted in this discipline, she has already won many prizes, however now she must excel and win the biggest championships in order to quickly repay her creditor who would prefer to see her on the sidewalk.

== Characters ==
Miyuki Umino (海野 幸, Umino Miyuki)
The heroine of the story, Miyuki is a tennis prodigy, capable of beating one of the top tennis players in Japan even when out of practice. She has a pure heart and is devoted to her family above all else, but her desperation and the schemes of those around her quickly give her a terrible reputation as a "bad girl of tennis". She lost the Cinderella Cup to her rival Choko.
Ieyasu Umino (海野 家康, Umino Ieyasu)
Miyuki's brother, who disappears right after the start of the manga, but his ill-considered business schemes are what create the huge debt that Miyuki must pay off. He feels guilty about causing the deaths of their parents and his get-rich-quick schemes are an attempt to make up for the poverty he inflicted on his siblings.
Junji Sakurada (桜田 純二, Sakurada Junji)
The yakuza debt collector who shadows Miyuki and her career was himself once an aspiring athlete and is alternately threatening, supportive and discouraging. He hopes she can succeed and drags his feet when his superiors pressure him not to give her a chance, but he regularly points out the almost certain futility of what she's doing.
Kikuko Kaku (賀来 菊子, Kaku Kikuko)
A promising young tennis star who is Miyuki's first opponent and becomes a fervent advocate of the prodigy after losing to her. Kaku is a lesbian who is at least somewhat in love with Miyuki and this is used to spread malicious rumours that Miyuki has seduced Kaku.
Keiichiro Ohtori (鳳 圭一郎, Ōtori Keiichirō)
The son of one of the grande dames of Japanese tennis, he went to school with Miyuki and she turns to him for assistance in getting her tennis career started. He is thoroughly under the thumb of his tyrannical mother however and this limits the assistance he will give her. He is a good tennis player but his mother decides he lacks the potential to be the best and forbids him to pursue a professional career in tennis.
Utako Ohtori (鳳 唄子, Ōtori Utako)
Keiichiro's mother, who was once the champion of Japan. She is rich, vain, callous and vengeful, hating Miyuki for being the daughter of the man she could not get. However she agrees to sponsor and train Miyuki in order to use her to embarrass the rival Ryugasaki family. Miyuki's bad reputation starts with Utako's teaching Miyuki a very unsportsmanlike maneuver on the tennis courts and insisting that Miyuki use it to humiliate her opponent.
Choko Ryugasaki (竜ヶ崎 蝶子, Ryūgasaki Chōko)
The daughter of Hanae Ryugasaki, Utako's rival from Kyoto, Choko is also Miyuki's unscrupulous arch-rival who delights in sabotaging Miyuki with cruel practical jokes and scurrilous rumours. She portrays herself as a cute and innocent victim of Miyuki's wickedness.
Thunder Ushiyama (サンダー牛山, Ushiyama Sandā)
Miyuki's rather lecherous tennis coach. He used to train big-name tennis players but was banned from the sport for life when he was accused of rigging a game. Nonetheless, he is apparently an exceptional coach and was personally hired by Madame Ohtori to coach Miyuki.

== Media ==
=== Manga ===
Written and illustrated by Naoki Urasawa, Happy! began weekly serialization in Big Comic Spirits in 1993. In December 1994, Urasawa began the semi-monthly series Monster and created both manga simultaneously until Happy! ended in 1999. Publisher Shogakukan collected the 254 chapters into 23 tankōbon volumes between February 28, 1994, and May 29, 1999. They republished the series in a 15 volume kanzenban edition between December 25, 2003, and June 30, 2004.

=== Volumes ===
No.	Release date	ISBN
01	February 28, 1994	4-09-183401-9
02	May 30, 1994	4-09-183402-7
03	August 30, 1994	4-09-183403-5
04	November 30, 1994	4-09-183404-3
05	February 28, 1995	4-09-183405-1
06	May 30, 1995	4-09-183406-X
07	August 30, 1995	4-09-183407-8
08	November 30, 1995	4-09-183408-6
09	January 30, 1996	4-09-183409-4
10	April 27, 1996	4-09-183410-8
11	June 29, 1996	4-09-184291-7
12	September 30, 1996	4-09-184292-5
13	November 30, 1996	4-09-184293-3
14	April 2, 1997	4-09-184294-1
15	May 30, 1997	4-09-184295-X
16	August 30, 1997	4-09-184296-8
17	November 29, 1997	4-09-184297-6
18	March 30, 1998	4-09-184298-4
19	June 30, 1998	4-09-184299-2
20	September 30, 1998	4-09-184300-X
21	December 19, 1998	4-09-185221-1
22	February 26, 1999	4-09-185222-X
23	May 29, 1999	4-09-185223-8

=== Live-action films ===
The manga was adapted into two live-action television films that were broadcast on TBS in 2006. The first, simply titled Happy!, aired on April 7, 2006. It was released on DVD on November 29, 2006, including scenes not shown during the TV broadcast. The second film, Happy! 2 ~Watashi, Senpai no Tame ni Ganbarimasu~ (Happy!2~私、先輩の為にガンバリます~), was broadcast on December 26, 2006.

Cast

- Saki Aibu as Miyuki Umino
- Hiroyuki Miyasako as Junji Sakurada
- Junnosuke Taguchi as Keiichiro Ootori
- Mao Kobayashi as Chouko Ryuugasaki
- Jun Natsukawa as Kikuko Kaku
- Yoshiyuki Morishita as Momotarou Yamaguchi
- Nagisa Katahira as Utako Ootori
- Baku Numata as Katsuragi
- YosiYosi Arakawa as Ieyasu Umino
- Sho Aikawa as Kyouhei Wanibuchi
- Eri Watanabe as Hanae Ryuugasaki

== Reception ==
The Happy! manga series has over 18 million copies in circulation. In 2020, Mark Sammut of Comic Book Resources called Happy! Urasawa's "most depressing manga ever" and wrote that it "strikes a middle-ground between the author's more conventional earlier work and the character studies that would come to define his greatest projects". In 2025, Urasawa cited Happy! as easily his favorite manga that he created. Although admitting it is not perfect, he said it is the one with which he felt like he was truly shattering conventions and breaking norms.
