= Asadora! =

Japanese manga series

- First tankōbon volume cover, featuring Asa

連続漫画小説 あさドラ！ (Renzoku Manga Shōsetsu Asadora!)
- Genre: Drama; Mystery; Science fiction
- Manga
- Written by: Naoki Urasawa
- Published by: Shogakukan
- English publisher: NA: Viz Media
- Magazine: Weekly Big Comic Spirits
- Original run: October 6, 2018 – present
- Volumes: 10
- icon

Asadora! (Japanese: 連続漫画小説 あさドラ!, Hepburn: Renzoku Manga Shōsetsu Asadora!; 'Serial Manga Novel Asadora!') is a Japanese manga series written and illustrated by Naoki Urasawa. It has been serialized in Shogakukan's Weekly Big Comic Spirits since October 2018, with its chapters published in ten tankōbon volumes as of September 2026. It has been licensed for English release in North America by Viz Media.

Asadora! tells the story of Asa Asada's life, starting in post-war Japan and spanning into the year 2020, when a large monster rampages through Tokyo. The story begins in 1959 when Asa looks for a doctor for her mother in labor, only for her to run into a burglar and be held for ransom. When Typhoon Vera hits Japan, Asa and her kidnapper must work together to survive.

In 2021, Asadora! won the Lucca Comics Award for Best Manga Series.

== Plot ==
In 1959, just moments before Typhoon Vera makes landfall at the Port of Nagoya, 12-year-old Asa Asada frantically seeks help from a local obstetrician to help deliver her mother's twelfth child. When she witnesses Kasuga attempting a burglary during the storm, Asa is mistaken as a member of the doctor's family and is taken hostage. When Kasuga realizes his mistake, he regrets his actions, blaming his hard luck after returning from World War II as bomber pilot. He protects Asa from the storm's damage, and the pair work together to distribute food to flood victims by flying a stolen airplane.

As they search the area for Asa's home, they see a large monster's footprint in the debris. Kasuga and Asa locate two of her siblings stranded on a rooftop with the obstetrician, who is holding a newborn child. Asa saves them from the monster, but discovers that Kasuga is wounded. He guides Asa as she flies the plane back to land, and Asa confesses her wish to keep the airplane. Asa attempts to blackmail the plane's owner, who is secretly using the aircraft to smuggle drugs, and he signs over the plane to her before going into police custody.

In 1964, Asa is 17 years old and operating an aircraft company with Kasuga. Kasuga is visited by Colonel Jissoji, a former military commander, who shows him a recent photo of the same monster they encountered years earlier. Attempting to research the monster on her own, Asa meets young scholar Keiichi Nakaido at the National Museum of Nature and Science, who has photo evidence of the monster among the disorganized research left by his mentor, Shinnosuke Yodogawa. Colonel Jissoji gives Asa and Kasuga a secret mission to protect the opening ceremonies of the 1964 Olympic Games by converting their aircraft into a makeshift fighter plane. Meanwhile, Asa is pressured by her school friend Yone to accompany her to Tokyo for a talent agent meeting, keeping it secret from their close friend Miyako. Restaurant owner Kinuyo, now acting as the remaining Asada children's adoptive mother, defends them against local bullies.

Meanwhile, the monster emerges in Sagami Bay, one day before the start of the Olympics. Colonel Jissoji collects Asa from school to bring her to the airfield in preparation to face the monster. Kasuga is unreachable after chasing a newspaper photographer away from the airfield, which results in an accident. Asa decides to fly the mission herself, but Nakaido insists on accompanying her so he can study the monster up close. Yone skips school to meet the talent agent but is secretly followed by Miyako.

Asa and Nakaido confront the monster and launch the aircraft's makeshift rockets, but the monster is unharmed. Asa decides to drop bags of fuel on it, lighting the gasoline on fire with her signal flare. The monster is wounded and chases after Asa, who leads it back out into the ocean away from coast. When Asa's plane goes too far out to sea, Kasuga appears in a second aircraft to guide her back to land. Yone's audition puts her in an uncomfortable situation, but Nakaido's uncle Eisaku arrives to chaperone her. The agent and Eisaku team together to change Yone's image to resemble to Marilyn Monroe and prepare her for a professional debut. Miyako is rescued from street thugs by Ginko and Susie, two female wrestlers, and she declares she will study wrestling against her parents' objections.

Following the opening ceremonies, Colonel Jissoji enlists Asa and Kasuga to stay on call in case of another monster attack. Sho's family pushes him to simulate the Olympic marathon competition during the actual event, but he loses courage and quits. Young SDF Lieutenant Kosugi suspects the government is covering up a kaiju attack and fakes an emergency on his naval cruiser to take a closer look, causing his ship to be damaged by the monster. Asa and Kasuga pilot the plane to battle the monster off the coast of Japan, wounding it again to stop its attack. Sho takes drugs on the beach and witnesses the fight, hallucinating that he transformed into a kyodai hero.

In 1968, Asa continues to run her aircraft company while fighting off the monster's repeated attempts to make landfall. She comes to the aid of Yone, who becomes the center of a tabloid scandal. When Asa sneaks into Shibuya to help, she accidentally meets the young American singer, River Etheridge, who created the song she has been singing since she was 12 years old. She discovers he is a soldier who has deserted his post in the Vietnam War and is hiding in Japan. Kosugi is haunted by visions of the monster attack and meets Sho, who is now a member of cult who watches for the monster's next appearance.

== Characters ==
Asa Asada (浅田 アサ, Asada Asa)
12-year-old (later, 17-year-old) student in Nagoya, the next-to-youngest of 12 children. She becomes a professional pilot.
Haruo Kasuga (春日 晴夫, Kasuga Haruo)
A World War II veteran pilot who turns to burglary and kidnapping. He later aids Asa in her flight training.
Kinuyo (きぬよさん, Kinuyo-san)
A local restaurant owner who cares for Asa and her remaining siblings after Typhoon Vera.
Shotaro (Sho) Hayata (早田 正太, Hayata Shotaro)
A friend of Asa; a young man who dreams of racing in the 1964 Tokyo Olympics.
Keiichi Nakaido (仲井戸 慶一, Nakaido Keiichi)
An out-of work biological researcher who searches for evidence of a monster in the notes of his mentor, Shinnosuke Yodogawa.
Yone (ヨネちゃん, Yone-san) and Miyako (ミヤコちゃん, Miyako-san)
Asa's high school friends who dream of becoming pop singers.
Colonel Minoru Jissoji (実相寺 実, Jissoji Minoru)
A former military commander (known as the "Kill King") and associate of Kasuga. He recruits Kasuga and Asa to track a mysterious monster.
Eisaku Noro (野呂 栄作)
Keiichi's uncle, owner of a run-down Tokyo cabaret.
Shinroku (信六) , Hazuki (ハヅキ) and Koshichi (孝七)
The surviving children of the Asada family following Typhoon Vera.
A-kura, B-to, and C-na
Special agents under the command of Colonel Shissoji.
Ginko Kondou (金剛 銀子, Kondō Ginko) and Susie Kaneiri
Female wrestlers who befriend Miyako.
Lieutenant Kosugi
A SDF Naval Lieutenant who searches for information about the monster.
River Etheridge
An American soldier who has deserted the Vietnam War. He wrote Asa's favorite song.
Yamakura
A newspaper reporter investigating reports of the monster's appearances.

== Production ==
Naoki Urasawa had the initial idea for Asadora! after the 2011 Tōhoku earthquake and tsunami. Wanting a hero that would give readers hope, the author said the main character naturally became a woman because when he draws males the story tends to get dark and depressing. Wanting this character to confront a "certain crisis" at the 1964 Summer Olympics via airplane, she had to be 17-years-old at that point to get a pilot's license. Additionally, while researching Urasawa stumbled upon the 1959 Isewan Typhoon, during which time the girl would be 12, and decided it would be "nice" to begin the story with a 12-year-old girl. This also made Nagoya the setting for the manga. Yuki Takanami, editor of the French version of the series for Kana, stated that its title is a reference to NHK's Renzoku Terebi Shōsetsu television dramas, which are colloquially known as "asadora" and often follow the life of a female protagonist from childhood to adulthood.

The sense of fulfillment Urasawa felt after doing all the backgrounds, inking, erasing, and screentones on the short story "It's a Beautiful Day" led to him doing a lot of the background work on Asadora! by himself, in addition to the main character illustration.

The series' first arc finished in January 2019, and it went on hiatus until May of the same year. The series went on hiatus again in August 2019 and resumed publication in October of the same year. It went on hiatus in July 2025 and is set to resume in March 2026.

== Publication ==
Asadora! started in Shogakukan's seinen manga magazine Weekly Big Comic Spirits on October 6, 2018. Asadora! is Urasawa's first work published digitally and his first work in the magazine since 21st Century Boys, serialized in 2007. Shogakukan has compiled its chapters into individual tankōbon volumes. The first volume was published on March 29, 2019. As of September 30, 2026, ten volumes have been published.

In North America, Viz Media announced the English release of the manga in July 2020. The first volume was published on January 19, 2021.

=== Volumes ===
No.	Original release date	Original ISBN	English release date	English ISBN
1	March 29, 2019	978-4-09-860278-0	January 19, 2021	978-1-9747-1746-0
01. "The Girl Who Ran Past" (駆け抜ける少女, Kakenukeru Shōjo); 02. "Two in the Storm" (嵐の中のふたり, Arashi no Naka no Futari); 03. "Hero of the Skies" (空の勇者, Sora no Yūsha); 04. "Shelter from the Storm" (嵐からの隠れ場所, Arashi kara no Kakure Basho); 05. "The Flood" (高潮, Takashio); 06. "Diner Kinuyo" (めし処 きぬよ, Meshidokoro Kinuyo); 07. "The Chosen One" (選ばれた子, Erabareta Ko); 08. "Claw Marks" (ツメアト, Tsumeato)
2	September 30, 2019	978-4-09-860433-3	April 20, 2021	978-1-9747-2010-1
09. "That Thing" (アレ..., Are...); 10. "Close Encounter" (遭遇, Sōgū); 11. "At the Controls" (操縦桿, Sōjūkan); 12. "Truly Flying" (本物の飛行機乗り, Honmono no Hikōki-nori); 13. "Birthday" (誕生の日, Tanjō no Hi); 14. "That Airplane" (あの飛行機, Ano Hikōki); 15. "Age 17" (17歳, Jūnanasai); 16. "Don't Turn Around" (ふりむかないで, Furimukanaide)
3	February 28, 2020	978-4-09-860587-3	July 20, 2021	978-1-9747-2011-8
17. "A Slight Possibility" (ほんの少しの可能性, Honnosukoshi no Kanōsei); 18. "Five Rings" (五つの輪, Itsutsu no Wa); 19. "Things You Can't Say" (絶対に言えないこと, Zettai ni Ienai Koto); 20. "The Search Begins" (探しモノ, Sagashi Mono); 21. "Letters" (手紙, Tegami); 22. "Just a Fighter Plane" (ただの戦闘機, Tada no Sentōki); 23. "Kinuyo's Wrath" (きぬよ、怒鳴り込む, Kinuyo, Donarikomu)
4	August 28, 2020	978-4-09-860738-9	October 19, 2021	978-1-9747-2296-9
24. "The Day It Appears" (出現の日, Shutsugen no Hi); 25. "Communication Breakdown" (コミュニケーション・ブレイクダイウン, Komyunikēshon Bureikudaiun); 26. "Garbage" (ゴミ, Gomi); 27. "A Big Sister's Job" (お姉ちゃんの役割, Onē-chan no Yakuwari); 28. "The Accident" (アクシデント, Akushidento); 29. "Ignition!" (イグニッション！, Igunisshon!); 30. "Close Encounter" (遭遇, Sōgū)
5	April 30, 2021	978-4-09-861078-5	April 19, 2022	978-1-9747-2790-2
31. "Time of Confrontation" (決戦の時, Kessen no Toki); 32. "Lock On!"; 33. "Deciphered" (解説, Kaisetsu); 34. "Launch!" (発射！, Hassha!); 35. "Drop!" (投下！, Tōka!); 36. "Pitch Black" (真っ暗闇, Makkurayami); 37. "A Real Pilot" (本当の飛行士, Hontō no Hikōshi)
6	December 28, 2021	978-4-09-861231-4	November 15, 2022	978-1-9747-3445-0
38. "Oct. 10, 1964—Clear Skies" (1964年10月10日、晴天なり, Sen-kyūhyaku-rokujū-yon-nen Jūgatsu Jūnichi, Seiten'nari); 39. "Transistor Radio" (トランジスタラジオ, Toranjisuta Rajio); 40. "Capsules" (カプセル, Kapuseru); 41. "On the Platform" (プラットホームにて, Purattohōmu nite); 42. "The Youth" (若者たち, Wakamono-tachi); 43. "Day of the Starting Gun" (号砲の日, Gōhō no Hi); 44. "Unidentified Object" (不詳物体, Fushō Buttai)
7	November 30, 2022	978-4-09-861546-9	October 17, 2023	978-1-9747-4054-3
45. "To the Sea" (海へ..., Umi e...); 46. "At the Beach" (渚にて, Nagisanite); 47. "Superhuman" (超人, Chōjin); 48. "One Blow!" (一撃!, Ichigeki!); 49. "Landing" (着地, Chakuchi); 50. "The Birth of a Hero" (ヒーロー誕生, Hīrō Tanjō); 51. "Returning from Work" (仕事帰り, Shigoto Kaeri)
8	December 27, 2023	978-4-09-862669-4	November 19, 2024	978-1-9747-4974-4
52. "Audition" (オーディション, Ōdishon); 53. "A Star is Born...?" (スター誕生...？, Sutā Tanjō...?); 54. "Youth in 1964" (1964年の青春, 1964-nen no Seishun); 55. "The Shiosai Dancer" (潮騒の踊り子, Shiosai no Odoriko); 56. "Entering the Tiger's Den" (虎穴に入らずんば..., Koketsu ni Hairazunba); 57. "Running in Darkness" (暗闇へ突っ走れ, Kurayami e Tsuppashire); 58. "Encounter" (邂逅, Kaigō)
9	November 28, 2024	978-4-09-863132-2	January 27, 2026	978-1-9747-5789-3
59. "Deserter" (脱走兵, Dassō-hei); 60. "Shibuya, 7:00 P.M." (渋谷は夜の7時, Shibuya wa Yoru no 7-ji); 61. "Scoop" (特ダネ, Tokudane); 62. "Singing Lesson" (歌のレッスン, Uta no Ressun); 63. "Savior" (救世主, Kyuuseishu); 64. "Ripped Love Letter" (破れたラブレター, Yabureta Raburetā); 65. "Come to My House" (カモナマイハウス, Kamona mai Hausu)
10	September 30, 2026	978-4-09-864133-8	—	—

== Reception ==
Asadora! won Best Series at the 2021 Lucca Comics Awards in Italy. It was also nominated for 2021's Young Adults Best Comic Award at the 48th Angoulême International Comics Festival in France and for Best Manga at the Harvey Awards in the United States. Due to depicting the Isewan Typhoon, Asadora! was used as part of an exhibit at the Nagoya City Minato Disaster Prevention Center.

After reading the first volume, South Korean film director Bong Joon-ho wrote that "Asa's wise expression and dignified demeanor already gives me hope and strong expectations", and called Urasawa "the greatest storyteller of our time". He likened the experience of reading Asadora! to that of being able to go back and read 20th Century Boys for the first time again. Rebecca Silverman of Anime News Network gave the first volume an A− grade. She wrote: "This is a very solid work. Asa is the kind of spitfire heroine that's easy to get behind." Reuben Baron of Comic Book Resources said, "As a piece of historical fiction, Asadora! is so convincing that it's almost a surprise once the science fiction elements pop up again in the last two pages of the book." David Cirone of J-Generation pointed out the series' combination of elements from Urasawa's previous series, including character styles, genre features, and cover design.
