= Meisei University =

Japanese private university

Coordinates: 35.64574°N 139.40973°E

- 明星大学, Meisei Daigaku
- Type: Private University
- Established: 1964
- Location: Tokyo, Japan
- Website: www.meisei-u.ac.jp

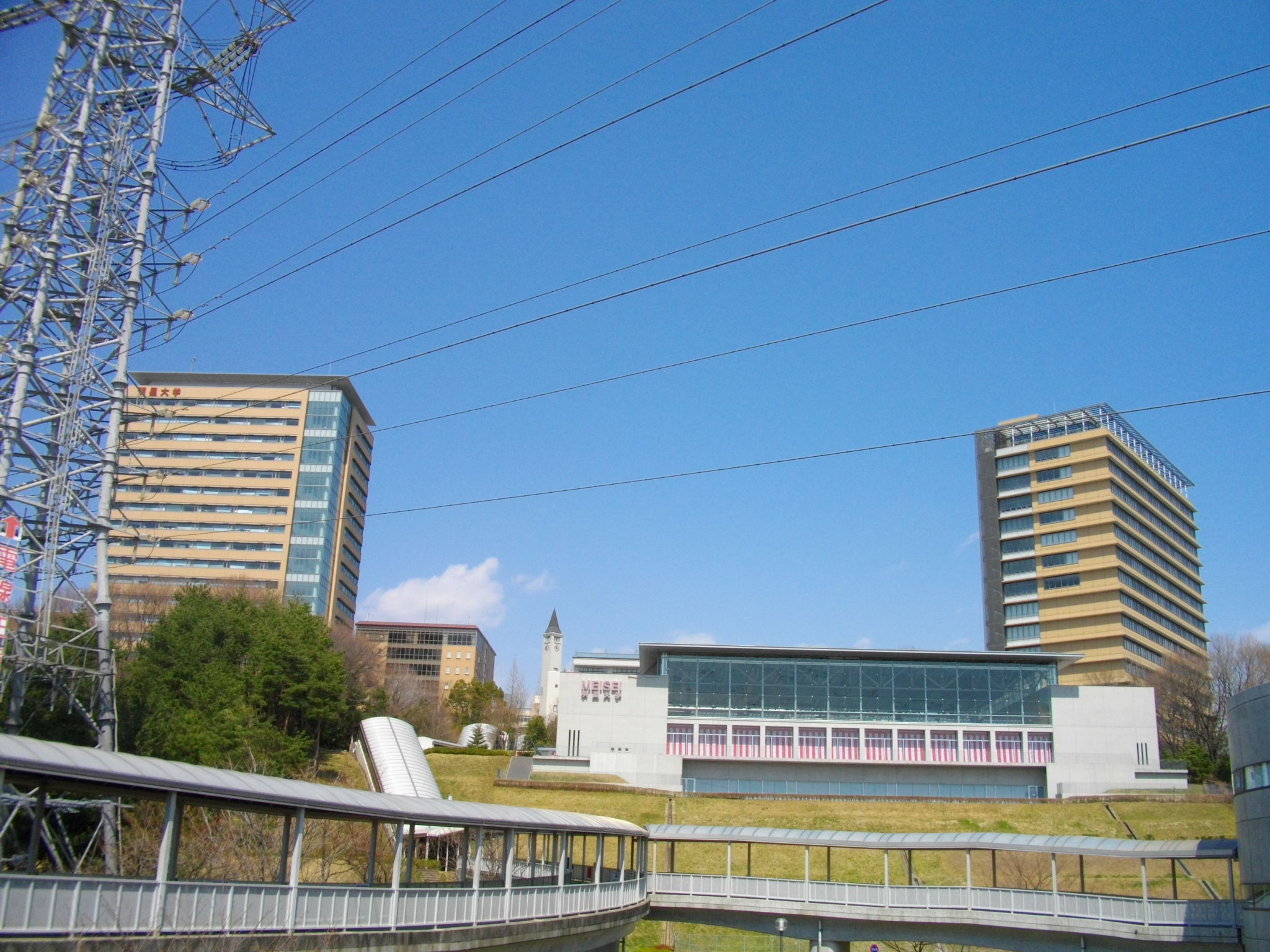
Hino Campus

Meisei University (明星大学, Meisei Daigaku) is a private university in Tokyo, Japan. The school's two campuses are in Hino (along with the headquarters) and Ōme. It also offers correspondence courses which it introduced in 1967.

== History ==
The university developed from the Meisei Gakuen Institute, that had been founded in 1951 as a parent to several schools that had been founded since 1923. The university was opened in 1964 with just one faculty, the Faculty of Physical Sciences and Engineering. Further faculties were added:

- Faculty of Humanities and Social Sciences, 1965.
- Department of Economics, 1966.
- Graduate School of Humanities and Social Sciences, 1971.
- Graduate School of Physical Sciences and Engineering, 1972.
- Faculty of Japanese Culture, 1992.
- Faculty of Informatics, 1992.
- Graduate School of Informatics, 1998.

== Notable alumni ==
- Naoki Urasawa - Japanese manga artist
