= Nagoya Zokei University =

Higher education institution in Aichi Prefecture, Japan

Nagoya Zokei University of Art & Design
- 名古屋造形大学
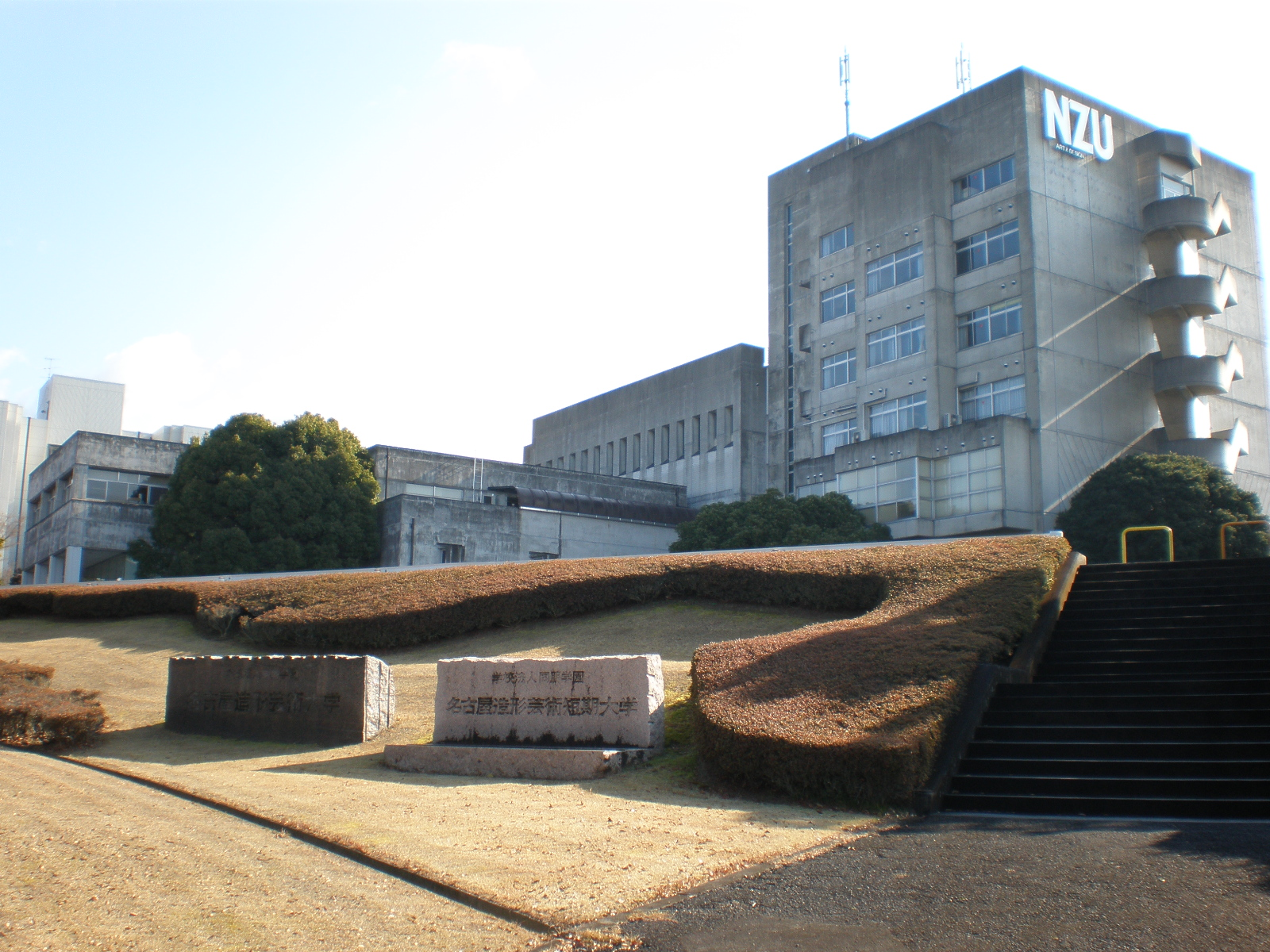
- Nagoya Zokei University of Art & Design
- Type: Private
- Established: 1967
- Location: Komaki, Aichi, Japan; 35.297°N 137.003°E
- Website: www.nzu.ac.jp/en/

Nagoya Zokei University (名古屋造形大学, Nagoya zōkei daigaku) is a private university in Komaki, Aichi, Japan. The predecessor of the school was founded in 1967, and it was opened as a university in 2003.
