= Nakaima =

Nakaima (written: 仲井眞 or なかいま in hiragana) is a Japanese surname. Notable people with the surname include:

- Hirokazu Nakaima (仲井眞 弘多) (born 1939), Japanese businessman and politician
- Tsuyoshi Nakaima (なかいま 強) (born 1960), Japanese manga artist
