= List of Golgo 13 chapters =

Written and illustrated by Takao Saito, Golgo 13 has been serialized in the semimonthly manga magazine Big Comic since its January 1969 issue, published in October 1968. The chapters have been collected into tankōbon volumes by Shogakukan and Leed Publishing, a spinoff of the author's own Saito Production, since June 21, 1973. As of August 2026, 221 volumes of the tankōbon edition have been published, while the bunkoban edition has 177 volumes.

In 2006, Golgo 13 was brought back by Viz as part of their Viz Signature collection. The stories are picked from the forty-year history of the manga, and do not necessarily represent the original's order of publication. A total of thirteen volumes were published, with the thirteenth volume being published on February 19, 2008. Each volume ends with an editorial commentary on Golgo 13 as a cultural phenomenon in Japan.

In 2021, the manga broke the Guinness World Record for "most volumes published for a single manga series". The series was tied with Kochira Katsushika-ku Kameari Kōen-mae Hashutsujo which published its 200th and final volume on September 17, 2016.

== Golgo 13 SP Tankōbon ==
No.	Japanese release date	Japanese ISBN
1	June 21, 1973	4-8458-0001-2
1. "Operation Big Safe" (ビッグ・セイフ作戦, "Biggu. seifu sakusen"); 2. "The Howls of Delos" (デロスの咆哮, "Derosu no hōkō"); 3. "Perversion of a Wolf and Rose" (バラと狼の倒錯, "Bara to ōkami no tōsaku"); 4. "The Faded Crest" (色あせた紋章, "Iroaseta monshō")
2	August 25, 1973	4-8458-0002-0
5. "Sleepers in the Cage" (檻の中の眠り, "Ori no naka no nemuri"); 6. "The Midnight Sun Wails for Love" (白夜は愛のうめき, "Byakuya wa ai no umeki"); 7. "Booby trap" (ブービートラップ, "Būbī torappu"); 8. "The Black Simoom" (黒い熱風, "Kuroi neppū"); 9. "Cote d'Azure" (南仏海岸, "Nanfutsu kaigan"); 10. "Golgo in the Sandstorm" (ゴルゴin砂嵐, "Gorugo in sunaarashi")
3	October 25, 1973	4-8458-0003-9
12. "GT the Sniper" (狙撃のGT, "Sogeki no GT"); 11. "Where the Stagecoaches Ran" (駅馬車の通った町, "Eki basha no kayotta machi"); 13. "Melancholy Summer" (メランコリー・夏, "Merankorī natsu"); 14. "Bannings the Hunter" (猟官・バニングス, "Ryōkan baningusu"); 19. "Via Beirut" (ベイルートVIA, "Beirūto VIA"); 20. "Insect: The Last Spy" (最後の間諜―虫―, "Saigo no kanchō― mushi―")
4	December 22, 1973	4-8458-0004-7
24. "See Through Inspection" (査察シースルー, "Sasatsu shī surū"); 15. "Who!?" (WHO!?, "Who!?"); 29. "Not Worth the Price" (価値なき値, "Kachi naki ne"); 30. "" (魔笛のシュツカ, "Mateki no shutsuka")
5	February 14, 1974	4-8458-0005-5
32. "The Target Has Returned" (帰ってきた標的, "Kaette kita hyōteki"); 16. "An Intersection of Murderous Designs" (殺意の交差, "Satsui no kōsa"); 18. "The White Deadline" (白の死線, "Shiro no shisen"); 17. "The Blood-Stained Stadium" (スタジアムに血を流して, "Sutajiamu ni chi o nagashite"); 33. "The Republic of Hunger" (飢餓共和国, "Kiga kyōwa-koku")
6	April 25, 1974	4-8458-0006-3
34. "When One Looks Good in Mourning Clothes" (喪服の似合うとき, "Mofuku no niau toki"); 21. "Love Is a Knife" (ラブはナイフ, "Rabu wa naifu"); Special 1. "" (17人の渇き, "17-nin no kawaki"); 35. "Enraged Earth" (激怒の大地, "Gekido no daichi")
7	June 25, 1974	4-8458-0007-1
37. "At Pin-Hole!" (AT PIN-HOLE!, "At Pin-Hole!"); 22. "Dr. V. Walter" (Dr.V・ワルター, "Dr. V. Warutā"); Special 3. "International Diamond Security Agency" (国際ダイヤモンド保安機構, "Kokusai daiyamondo hoan kikō"); 36. "Number Deposit Account" (番号預金口座, "Bangō yokin kōza")
8	October 25, 1974	4-8458-0008-X
40. "Manitoba" (マニトバ, "Manitoba"); Special 5. "Wonderful Chicago" (素晴らしきシカゴ, "Subarashiki Shikago"); Special 2. "" (デスマスクの肖像, "Desu masuku no shōzō"); 25. "The Masked Target" (仮面の標的, "Kamen no hyōteki"); 28. "Muddy Blood" (マッディブラッド, "Maddiburaddo")
9	December 25, 1974	4-8458-0009-8
38. "Lao poppy" (ラオスのけし, "Raosu no keshi"); Special 6. "Death Valley" (デス・バレイ, "Desu barei"); 23. "The Inland Zone" (内陸地帯, "Nairiku chitai"); Special 4. "Kill the White Pig For His Birthday" (誕生日に白豚を殺せ!!, "Tanjō hi ni shirobuta o korose!!"); 31. "Under the Dark Streetlight" (暗い街灯の下で, "Kurai gaitō no moto de")
10	February 20, 1975	4-8458-0010-1
39. "Snow on the Shoulders of a Black Dress" (雪は黒いドレスの肩に, "Yuki wa kuroi doresu no kata ni"); 45. "Our Man in Alaska" (アラスカ工作員, "Arasuka kōsaku-in"); 46. "Requiem as Fangs" (鎮魂歌に牙を, "Chinkon-ka ni kiba o"); 47. "Funeral in Rio" (リオの葬送, "Rio no sōsō"); 48. "Nazi Swastikas Remain Rust Free" (ナチス鉤十字章は錆びず, "Nachisu hari jūji shō wa sabizu"); 49. "La Carnaval" (ラ・カルナバル, "Ra karunabaru")
11	April 25, 1975	4-8458-0011-X
50. "Room No. 909" (ROOM・No.909, "Room No. 909"); 44. "Voodoo" (VOO DOO, "Voodoo"); 52. " Five People on the Border Line" (国境線の5人, "Kokkyō-sen no 5-nin"); 41. "And Then There Was Death" (そして死が残った, "Soshite shi ga nokotta")
12	June 24, 1975	4-8458-0012-8
54. "Profit from Death" (死の収穫, "Shi no shūkaku"); 53. "Woman from Napoli" (ナポリの女, "Napori no onna"); 51. "Infiltration Route "G3" " (潜入ルート“G3”, "Sennyū rūto “G3”"); 27. "Cherbourg O300" (シェルブールO300, "Sheru būru O300")
13	August 25, 1975	4-8458-0013-6
55. "Angry Waves" (ANGRY WAVES, "Angry Waves"); 56. "Forest of Killing" (みな殺しの森, "Minagoroshi no mori"); 57. "Cassowary" (キャサワリー, "Kyasawarī")
14	October 25, 1975	4-8458-0014-4
59. "Kensaku Azuma, the Japanese" (日本人・東研作, "Nippon-nin. Azuma Ken saku"); 58. "" (カリブ海の死影, "Karibu-kai no shi kage"); 60. "A Reflection in the Desert" (砂漠の逆光, "Sabaku no gyakkō")
15	December 25, 1975	4-8458-0015-2
63. "" (モスクワ人形, "Mosukuwa ningyō"); 72. "" (残光, "Zankō"); 61. "Accidental" (アクシデンタル, "Akushidentaru")
16	February 25, 1976	4-8458-0016-0
62. "The Wolf of Kulong" (九竜の餓狼, "Kyūryū no garō"); 67. "Dabbie!" (“Dabbie!”, "Dabbie!"); 64. "Project Pegasus" (ペガサス計画, "Pegasasu keikaku")
17	April 25, 1976	4-8458-0017-9
66. "" (柩に誓いを, "Hitsugi ni chikai o"); 71. "European Bureaucratic Special Flight" (欧州官僚特別便, "Ōshū kanryō tokubetsu bin"); 68. "" (死を運ぶ者共, "Shi o hakobu mono tomo")
18	June 25, 1976	4-8458-0018-7
69. "Action in 4/24 Seconds" (動作・24分の4, "Dōsa. 24-bun no 4"); 70. "Heat Wave" (ヒート・ウエーブ, "Hīto ueibu"); 73. "White Giant" (白い巨人, "Shiroi kyojin")
19	August 25, 1976	4-8458-0019-5
77. "Jet Stream" (ジェット・ストリーム, "Jetto sutorīmu"); 74. "Early Autumn" (アーリィ・オータム, "Ārī ōtamu"); 78. "" (幽霊定期便, "Yūrei teiki bin")
20	October 25, 1976	4-8458-0020-9
79. "Peggy's Lullaby" (ペギーの子守歌, "Pegī no komori uta"); 82. "Five-Clawed Dragon of the Crest of Killing" (殺しの紋章五爪竜, "Koroshi no monshō go tsume ryū"); 80. "" (銃殺人ひとり, "Jūsatsu-nin hitori")
21	December 25, 1976	4-8458-0021-7
85. "Statistically Explained Sniping" (統計解析射撃 ダラスの疑惑, "Tōkei kaiseki shageki Darasu no giwaku"); 81. "Eva, Heading to the Sea" (海へ向かうエバ, "Umi e mukau Eba"); 84. "National Peace-keeping Department" (国家秩序維持省, "Kokka chitsujo iji-shō")
22	February 25, 1977	4-8458-0022-5
75. "East of Suez" (スエズの東, "Suezu no higashi"); 83. "The Dark-Skinned Sniper" (黒い肌の狙撃者, "Kuroi hada no sogeki-sha"); 87. "Corridor to Hell" (地獄への回廊, "Jigoku e no kairō")
23	April 25, 1977	4-8458-0023-3
91. "Island of Witchcraft" (呪術の島, "Jujutsu no shima"); 86. "" (折れた矢, "Oreta ya"); 90. "Face of the Infiltrator" (潜入者の素顔, "Sennyū-sha no sugao")
24	June 25, 1977	4-8458-0024-1
92. "The Man With The Curve" (曲線の男, "Kyokusen no otoko"); 88. "Hydra" (ヒドラ, "Hidora"); 89. "Plutonium 239" (プルトニウム239, "Purutoniumu 239")
25	August 25, 1977	4-8458-0025-X
93. "Endless Night" (夜は消えず, "Yoru wa kiezu"); 96. "California Legion" (カリフォルニア軍団, "Kariforunia gundan"); 97. "" (レディ・ビッチ, "Redi bicchi")
26	October 25, 1977	4-8458-0026-8
94. "Breakpoint" (破局点, "Hakyoku ten"); 98. "Job From a Saint" (聖者からの依頼, "Seija kara no irai"); 101. "Halloween, New York" (ハロウィン・ニューヨーク, "Harowin Nyūyōku")
27	January 5, 1978	4-8458-0027-6
100. "The Serizawa Family Murders" (芹沢家殺人事件, "Serizawa-ka satsujin jiken"); 99. "Reunion With a 60 Day Blank" (60日間の空白への再会, "60 kakan no kūhaku e no saikai")
28	April 25, 1978	4-8458-0028-4
43. "" (ゲート・イン, "Geito in"); 95. "The Superstar" (ザ・スーパースター, "Za sūpāsutā"); 102. "Song of the Dead" (死者の唄, "Shisha no uta")
29	August 15, 1978	4-8458-0029-2
42. "The Melancholy of the Queen" (女王陛下の憂鬱, "Joō heika no yūutsu"); 107. "Missing Mr. H." (行方不明のH氏, "Yukue fumei no H-shi"); 104. "Scandal! The Unpaid Contract" (スキャンダルの未払い金, "Sukyandaru no miharai kin")
30	November 15, 1978	4-8458-0030-6
112. "" (アサシン暗殺教団, "Asashin ansatsu kyōdan"); 111. "Frozen Strait" (氷結海峡, "Hyōketsu kaikyō"); 103. "" (配役, "Haiyaku")
31	January 10, 1979	4-8458-0031-4
116. "Rape Song" (レイプ数え唄, "Reipu kazoeuta"); 109. "Howard Hughes' Son" (ハワード・ヒューズ氏の息子, "Hawādo Hyūzu-shi no musuko"); 105. "Shadow of Death" (落日の死影, "Rakujitsu no shi kage")
32	April 5, 1979	4-8458-0032-2
108. "Trap of the Emperor" (帝王の罠, "Teiō no wana"); 65. "Cross-Section of Blind Spots" (死角の断面, "Shikaku no danmen"); 118. "Ice Lake Hit" (大きな口の湖上, "Ōkina kuchi no kojō")
33	August 5, 1979	4-8458-0033-0
113. "Checkmate" (チェック・メイト, "Chekku meito"); 114. "Stalemate" (ステール・メイト, "Suteiru meito"); 26. "Dressed For Death" (死に絶えた盛装, "Shinitaeta seisō"); 121. "Revolt of the Battleship Yorkshire" (戦艦ヨークシャーの反乱, "Senkan Yōkushā no hanran")
34	October 5, 1979	4-8458-0034-9
117. "" (殲滅, "Senmetsu"); 124. "" (カリブの血だまり, "Karibu no chidamari"); 119. "" (三匹の女豹, "San-hiki no mehyō")
35	January 5, 1980	4-8458-0035-7
126. "Far From an Era" (ピリオドの向こう, "Piriodo no mukō"); 115. "An Offering to God" (神に贈られし物, "Kami ni okurare shi mono"); 122. "The Dictator's Supper" (独裁者の晩餐, "Dokusai-sha no bansan")
36	April 5, 1980	4-8458-0036-5
128. "" (おろしや間諜伝説, "Oroshi ya kanchō densetsu"); 125. "Pouring Into Lake Titicaca" (チチカカ湖はどしゃぶり, "Chichikaka-ko wa doshaburi"); 106. "" (焼けただれた砂, "Yaketadareta suna")
37	August 15, 1980	4-8458-0037-3
133. "Chinatown" (チャイナ・タウン, "Chaina taun"); Special 8. "" (英雄都市, "Eiyū toshi"); 76. "" (魔女の出てきた日, "Majo no dete kita hi"); 120. "" (軽火器VS戦車砲, "Kei kaki VS Sensha-hō")
38	October 5, 1980	4-8458-0038-1
129. "The Brute's Banquet" (鬼畜の宴, "Kichiku no en"); 130. "Sexy Tiger" (セクシー・タイガー, "Sekushī taigā"); 127. "" (タラントゥーラ＝舞踏蜘蛛); 123. "" (タンブル・ウイード, "Tanburu uīdo")
39	January 5, 1981	4-8458-0039-X
137. "The Orbital Hit" (軌道上狙撃, "Kidō-jō sogeki"); 110. "Playback" (プレイバック, "Purei bakku"); 135. "Soaring Flight" (飛翔, "Hishō")
40	April 5, 1981	4-8458-0040-3
134. "Touchdown" (タッチ・ダウン, "Tacchi daun"); 131. "The Light-Hearted Sniper" (陽気な狙撃者, "Yōki na sogeki-sha"); 138. "Aliens of America" (アメリカの異邦人, "Amerika no i hōjin"); Special 7. "" (蝶を射つ!!, "Chō o utsu! !")
41	August 5, 1981	4-8458-0041-1
141. "" (蒼狼漂う果て, "Ao ōkami tadayou hate"); Special 10. "A Glamorous Night in Acapulco" (アカプルコ散華の夜, "Akapuruko sange no yoru"); 139. "Gravestone in Sicily" (シシリー島の墓標, "Shishirī-tō no bohyō")
42	October 5, 1981	4-8458-0042-X
140. "Ivory Connection" (アイボリー・コネクション, "Aiborī konekushon"); 136. "The Sea God Awakens" (海神が目覚める, "Watatsumi ga mezameru"); 142. "" (波止場を我が手に, "Hatoba o waga te ni")
43	January 5, 1982	4-8458-0043-8
147. "Queen of Mystery" (ミステリーの女王, "Misuterī no joō"); Special 11. "Farewell Detective" (刑事よさらば, "Keiji yo-sa raba"); 144. "Hit and Run" (ヒット・エンド・ラン, "Hitto endo ran"); Special 9. "" (皇帝と共に北へ向かう, "Kōtei to tomo ni kita e mukau")
44	April 5, 1982	4-8458-0044-6
145. "" (モンゴルの鷹, "Mongoru no taka"); 148. "" (薔薇の下で, "Bara no moto de"); 132. "Wings of Death" (死の翼ふれるべし, "Shi no tsubasa furerubeshi"); 146. "La Mano Dias" (ラ・マニョ・ディアス, "Ra manyo diasu")
45	August 5, 1982	4-8458-0045-4
143. "" (地獄からの生還者, "Jigoku kara no seikan-sha"); 152. "" (ヒューム卿最後の事件, "Hyūmu kyō saigo no jiken"); 149. "Funeral in Tripoli" (トリポリの埋葬, "Toripori no maisō")
46	October 5, 1982	4-8458-0046-2
151. "Death to the Shah" (国王に死を, "Kokuō ni shi o"); 150. "Private Time" (PRIVATE TIME, "Private Time"); Special 12. "" (B&Cクラブ会員死す, "B&C kurabu kaiin shisu"); 159. "" (代打, "Daida")
47	January 5, 1983	4-8458-0047-0
154. "" (暗黒海流, "Ankoku kairyū"); 153. "Midnight Angel" (ミッドナイト・エンジェル, "Middonaito enjeru"); 158. "" (メスリーヌの猫, "Mesu Rīnu no neko")
48	April 5, 1983	4-8458-0048-9
157. "Behind the President" (ビハインド・ザ・プレジデント, "Bihaindo za purejidento"); 162. "Night Fog in Petticoat Lane" (ペチコートレーンの夜霧, "Pechikōto rein no yogiri"); 163. "Striking Back From Zero" (ゼロの反撃, "Zero no hangeki"); 161. "" (機関全開, "Kikan zenkai")
49	August 5, 1983	4-8458-0049-7
160. "Galinpero" (ガリンペイロ, "Garinpeiro"); 170. "" (依頼者の明日, "Irai-sha no asu"); 156. "" (ニューヨークの謎, "Nyūyōku no nazo")
50	October 5, 1983	4-8458-0050-0
164. "Robben Island Prison" (ロベン監獄島, "Roben kangoku-tō"); 172. "" (ペルセポネの誘拐, "Perusepone no yūkai"); 165. "Sleeper Agent" (スリーパー・エージェント, "Surīpā eijento")
51	January 5, 1984	4-8458-0051-9
168. "The Last Will of Mao Zedong" (毛沢東の遺言, "Mō Takutō no yuigon"); 155. "" (橋は崩れた, "Hashi wa kuzureta"); 169. "A Bullethole in the Mona Lisa" (モナリザの弾痕, "Mona Riza no dankon")
52	April 5, 1984	4-8458-0052-7
173. "Boiling Point" (沸騰, "Futtō"); 174. "Boiling Point - The Fourth Reich" (沸騰・第四帝国, "Futtō dai yon teikoku"); 167. "Christmas 24 Hours" (クリスマス・24アワーズ, "Kurisumasu 24 awāzu")
53	August 5, 1984	4-8458-0053-5
183. "Into The Wolves Lair" (崩壊 第四帝国 狼の巣, "Hōkai dai yon teikoku ōkami no su"); 166. "" (甦るスタンディング・ベア, "Homigaeru sutandingu bea"); 179. "Zdrowas Maryjo" (ズドロナス・マリヨ, "Zudoronasu Mariyo")
54	October 5, 1984	4-8458-0054-3
189. "Little Havana" (リトル・ハバナ, "Ritoru Habana"); 176. "Crop Wars - Blade of the Praying Mantis" (穀物戦争 蟷螂の斧, "Kokumotsu sensō tōrō no ono"); 180. "Crop Wars - Blade of the Praying Mantis - Polluted Gold" (穀物戦争 蟷螂の斧 汚れた金, "Kokumotsu sensō tōrō no ono yogoreta kin"); 185. "" (予期せぬ人々, "Yoki senu hitobito")
55	December 5, 1984	4-8458-0055-1
177. "Ebony Eyes" (EBONY EYES, "Ebony Eyes"); 182. "Saturday Night Special" (サタデーナイト・スペシャル, "Satadei naito supesharu"); 181. "" (里通外国, "Sato tsū gaikoku")
56	April 5, 1985	4-8458-0056-X
190. "Grain War" (複合標的群, "Fukugō hyōteki gun"); 192. "Bump the Gulliver" (バンプ・ザ・ガリバー, "Banpu za Garibā"); 171. "King of Birds" (KING OF BIRDS, "King of Birds"); 175. "" (獅子の椅子, "Shishi no isu")
57	August 5, 1985	4-8458-0057-8
187. "" (河豚の季節, "Fugu no kisetsu"); 191. "Last Loop" (ラスト・ループ, "Rasuto rūpu")
58	October 5, 1985	4-8458-0058-6
194. "The 110° Angle" (110度の狙点, "110 do no nerai ten"); 193. "The Kremlin Roster" (クレムリン名簿, "Kuremurin meibo"); 184. "Telepath" (テレパス, "Terepasu")
59	January 5, 1986	4-8458-0059-4
196. "Machine Cowboy" (マシン・カウボーイ, "Mashin kaubōi"); 178. "" (ジーク・ハイル!!, "Jīku Hairu!!"); 188. "The Argentine Tiger" (アルヘンチーノ・ティグレ, "Aruhenchīno tigure")
60	July 25, 1986	4-8458-0060-8
202. "Proxy Fight" (プロキシー・ファイト, "Purokishī faito"); 198. "" (シンプソン走路, "Shinpuson sōro"); 195. "The Messenger" (ザ・メッセンジャー, "Za messenjā")
61	October 5, 1986	4-8458-0061-6
205. "" (裏切りのスワスチカ, "Uragiri no suwasuchika"); 200. "Incident at Cottage Seven" (7号コテージ事件, "7 gō koteiji jiken"); 199. "Death Match: Diamond Cuts Diamond" (死闘ダイヤ・カット・ダイヤ, "Shitō daiya katto daiya")
62	January 5, 1987	4-8458-0062-4
208. "Father Pio Gregorio" (ビオ・グレゴリオ司教, "Bio Guregorio shikyō"); 201. "" (ルーサー・キングの遺産, "Rūsā Kingu no isan"); 197. "Go Up" (GO UP, "Go Up"); 204. "Headhunter" (ヘッドハンター, "Heddo hantā")
63	April 5, 1987	4-8458-0063-2
215. "Rockford's Ambition" (ロックフォードの野望, "Rokkufōdo no yabō"); 206. "Debug" (デバッグ, "Debaggu"); 203. "The Woman Photographer, Kim" (女カメラマン・キム, "Onna kameraman. Kimu"); 211. "AZ4 CP72" (AZ4 CP72, "AZ4 CP72")
64	August 10, 1987	4-8458-0064-0
209. "" (海難審判, "Kainan shinpan"); 219. "" (十月革命の子, "Jū gatsu kakumei no ko"); 213. "Wasteland" (2万5千年の荒野, "2 man 5 sen nen no kōya")
65	October 16, 1987	4-8458-0065-9
216. "Major Operation" (メジャー・オペレーション, "Mejā opereishon"); 220. "Irish Paddies" (アイリッシュ・パディーズ, "Airisshu padīzu"); 207. "Seal of Darkness" (闇の封印, "Yami no fūin")
66	February 8, 1988	4-8458-0066-7
221. "" (シーザーの眼, "Shīzā no me"); 212. "Dead Angle" (デッド・アングル, "Deddo anguru"); 218. "Rockford's Ambition (Flaw in the Strategy)" (ロックフォードの野望〈謀略の死角〉, "Rokkufōdo no yabō (Bōrya ku no shikaku)")
67	May 8, 1988	4-8458-0067-5
222. "Flashback" (フラッシュ・バック, "Furasshu bakku"); 224. "" (イリーガルの妻, "Irīgaru no tsuma"); 217. "Lucky the Swindler" (サギ師ラッキー, "Sagi-shi rakkī"); 226. "" (ファイアー・アフター, "Faiā afutā")
68	August 8, 1988	4-8458-0068-3
230. "Soldiers Sleep in the Woods" (兵士は森に眠る, "Heishi wa mori ni nemuru"); 210. "Moment of Truth" (真実の瞬間, "Shinjitsu no shunkan"); 229. "Steinbeck III" (スタインベック三世, "Sutainbekku san-sei"); 223. "" (偽りの五星紅旗, "Itsuwari no go-sei kōki")
69	January 8, 1989	4-8458-0069-1
214. "Spanish Harem" (スパニッシュ・ハーレム, "Supanisshu hāremu"); 228. "Hollywood Gambling" (ハリウッドギャンブル, "Hariuddo gyanburu"); 233. "" (弾道, "Dandō"); 234. "The Man Without a Heart" (心臓の無い男, "Shinzō no nai otoko")
70	May 5, 1989	4-8458-0070-5
238. "Nightmare" (ナイトメア, "Naitomea"); 227. "Pedigree Code" (血統の掟, "Kettō no okite"); 232. "Spiritual Weapon" (心霊兵器, "Shinrei heiki")
71	August 7, 1989	4-8458-0071-3
244. "" (アクロバティックス, "Akurobatikku su"); 225. "" (ソフホーズ, "Sofuhōzu"); 243. "Iceberg Cut" (アイスバーグ・カット, "Aisubāgu katto")
72	October 8, 1989	4-8458-0072-1
239. "South Florida Murder Game" (南フロリダ殺人ゲーム, "Minami Furorida satsujin geimu"); 236. "" (KGBの長い腕, "KGB no nagai ude"); 246. "" (見えない軍隊, "Mienai guntai")
73	January 4, 1990	4-8458-0073-X
242. "" (ドラゴン・バードへの実験, "Doragon bādo e no jikken"); 241. "Dive to Tripoli" (ダイブ to トリポリ, "Daibu to Toripori"); 247. "Field Test" (フィールド・テスト, "Fīrudo tesuto")
74	May 6, 1990	4-8458-0074-8
231. "Invisible Wings" (見えない翼, "Mienai tsubasa"); 235. "" (ワイルドギース, "Wairudo Gīsu"); 261. "West Latitude 175 Degrees" (西経一七五度, "Seikei ichi nana go do")
75	August 6, 1990	4-8458-0075-6
Special 13. "Sharpshoot on the G String" (G線上の狙撃, "G sen-jō no sogeki"); 250. "Battle of Sons" (バトル オブ サンズ, "Batoru obu sanzu"); 240. "System Down" (システム・ダウン, "Shisutemu daun")
76	October 6, 1990	4-8458-0076-4
255. "Santa Ana" (サンタ・アナ, "Santa Ana"); 260. "" (ラスト・ゴーギャン, "Rsuto Gōgyan"); 251. "" (ワッピング要塞, "Wappingu yōsai")
77	January 7, 1991	4-8458-0077-2
248. "Hollywood Cinderella" (ハリウッド・シンデレラ, "Hariuddo Shinderera"); 249. "Route 95" (ルート95, "Rūto 95"); Special 16. "" (汚れた重賞, "Yogoreta jūshō"); 257. "" (隠されたメッセージ, "Kakusareta messeiji")
78	May 5, 1991	4-8458-0078-0
Special 14. "He Who Brings About Calamity" (禍なすもの, "Ka nasu mono"); Special 17. "" (幻のジゼル, "Maboroshi no Jizeru"); Special 15. "" (メイティング・マテリアル, "Meitingu materiaru"); 258. "Russian Crisis" (ロシア・クライシス, "Roshia kuraishisu")
79	August 4, 1991	4-8458-0079-9
265. "Co-Stars" (スーパー・スターの共演, "Sūpā sutā no kyōen"); 254. "" (二十年目の毒, "Nijū nen-me no doku"); 259. "Persona Non Grata" (ペルソナ・ノン・グラータ, "Perusona non gurāta")
80	October 6, 1991	4-8458-0080-2
256. "Contaminated Paradise" (楽園の汚染, "Rakuen no osen"); 252. "A Haste in Lebanon" (レバノンの焦躁, "Rebanon no shōsō"); 269. "Beyond the Hot Sand" (熱砂の彼方に, "Nessa no kanata ni")
81	January 6, 1992	4-8458-0081-0
262. "" (すべて人民のもの, "Subete jinmin no mono"); 263. "Devil upon the Water" (悪魔の島影, "Akuma no shimakage")
82	May 7, 1992	4-8458-0082-9
267. "" (殺人呪法マクンバ, "Satsujin juhō makunba"); 275. "The Dolphin" (ザ・イルカ, "Za iruka"); 273. "" (白いサーカス, "Shiroi sākasu")
83	August 3, 1992	4-8458-0083-7
Special 23. "" (マイアミの奇跡, "Maiami no kiseki"); 264. "Civilian Control" (シビリアン・コントロール, "Shibirian kontorōru"); Special 20. "" (疫病神の道標, "Yakubyō kami no dōhyō"); 272. "Moscow Platoon" (モスクワ・プラトーン, "Mosukuwa puratōn")
84	October 7, 1992	4-8458-0084-5
279. "Levant Triangle" (レバント・トライアングル, "Rebanto toraianguru"); 276. "False News" (偽りの報道番組, "Itsuwari no hōdō bangumi"); 268. "Lonesome George" (ロンサム・ジョージ, "Ronsamu Jōji")
85	January 7, 1993	4-8458-0085-3
278. "Italian Connection" (イタリアン・コネクション, "Itarian konekushon"); Special 21. "" (公開処刑の日, "Kōkai shokei no hi"); Special 19. "Indian Summer" (インディアン・サマー, "Indian samā"); 271. "" (14Kの謎, "14K no nazo")
86	May 5, 1993	4-8458-0086-1
270. "Legend of the Eagle" (禿鷲伝説, "Hagewashi densetsu"); 253. "" (大学教授の私生活, "Daigaku kyōju no shi seikatsu")
87	August 8, 1993	4-8458-0087-X
283. "" (未来への遺産, "Mirai e no isan"); 281. "" (ロメオたちの西側, "Romeo-tachi no nishigawa"); 285. "" (ファイル消失, "Fairu shōshitsu")
88	October 9, 1993	4-8458-0088-8
284. "Dire Wolf at Sea" (餓狼おどる海, "Garō odoru umi"); 286. "" (東欧の激動・六日間革命, "Tōō no gekidō roku nichikan kakumei"); 282. "Program Trader" (プログラム・トレーダー, "Puroguramu toreidā")
89	January 4, 1994	4-8458-0089-6
320. "Best Bank" (BEST BANK, "Best Bank"); Special 22. "" (カリブの夢, "Karibu no yume"); 291. "" (人工知能AIの誤算, "Jinkō chinō AI no gosan")
90	May 6, 1994	4-8458-0090-X
277. "" (200年の輪廻, "200 nen no rinne"); Special 18. "" (ワシントン秘密工作 大統領はお元気?, "Washinton himitsu kōsaku daitōryō wa o genki?"); 296. "F1 Circus" (F1サーカス, "F1 sākasu")
91	August 7, 1994	4-8458-0091-8
280. "" (黄色い害虫, "Kiiroi gaichū"); 292. "" (顔のない逃亡者, "Kao no nai tōbō-sha"); Special 25. "" (死仮面の館, "Shi kamen no yakata"); 288. "Germany Is One" (ドイツはひとつ, "Doitsu wa hito-tsu")
92	October 9, 1994	4-8458-0092-6
299. "" (東亜共同体, "Tōa kyōdō tai"); 287. "Realm of God" (神の領域, "Kami no ryōiki"); 290. "The Deaths of June 3rd" (6月3日の死, "6 gatsu 3 nichi no shi")
93	January 1, 1995	4-8458-0093-4
Special 26. "Cross Angle" (クロスアングル, "Kurosu anguru"); 294. "" (マンモスの牙, "Manmosu no kiba"); 297. "K-Day Countdown" (Kデー・カウントダウン, "K dei kauntodaun")
94	May 6, 1995	4-8458-0094-2
274. "Assassination Instructor of the North" (北の暗殺教官, "Kita no ansatsu kyōkan"); Special 24. "Proud Wine" (誇り高き葡萄酒, "Hokori takaki budō-shu"); Special 28. "" (クラウン夫妻の死, "Kuraun fusai no shi"); 295. "" (アンコールの微笑, "Ankōru no bishō")
95	August 6, 1995	4-8458-0095-0
293. "" (日・米コメ戦争, "Nichibei kome sensō"); 303. "Circular Village" (円い村, "Marui mura"); 306. "" (安全地帯の亡霊, "Anzen chitai no bōrei")
96	October 7, 1995	4-8458-0096-9
309. "No Relation" (ノー・リレーション, "Nō rireishon"); 298. "" (情報漏洩源, "Jōhō rōei-gen"); 289. "" (ヨルダン川西岸, "Yorudan kawa seigan")
97	January 8, 1996	4-8458-0097-7
302. "Revelation of a Coup d' Etat" (覚醒・クーデターの謎, "Kakusei kūdetā no nazo"); 310. "" (最後の顧客, "Saigo no kokyaku"); 307. "" (静かなる記念日, "Shizuka naru kinen nichi")
98	May 5, 1996	4-8458-0098-5
304. "The Siberian Steam Whistle" (シベリアの汽笛, "Shiberia no kiteki"); Special 29. "Crushing Joker" (ジョーカーを砕く, "Jōkā o kudaku"); 301. "Way of the Wiseguy" (ワイズガイへの道, "Waizu gai e no dō")
99	August 5, 1996	4-8458-0099-3
300. "The Last Battlefield" (最後の戦場, "Saigo no senjō"); Special 27. "Those Waiting for the Bus" (バスを待つ人々, "Basu o matsu hitobito"); 311. "The Silent Army" (THE SILENT ARMY, "The Silent Army")
100	October 5, 1996	4-8458-1277-0
305. "Man of Gold" (黄金の男, "Ōgon no otoko"); Special 31. "" (ウエストウッドに死す, "Uesuto uddo ni shisu"); Special 30. "" (邯鄲の夢, "Kantan no yume"); 308. "Masterpiece Assault Rifle" (傑作・アサルトライフル, "Kessaku asaruto raifuru")
101	January 5, 1997	4-8458-1354-8
313. "Media Control" (メディアコントロール, "Media Kontorōru"); 312. "The Seed Seeker" (種子探索人, "Shushi tansaku-nin"); 316. "Empire of Chaos" (カオスの帝国, "Kaosu no teikoku")
102	May 2, 1997	4-8458-1540-0
315. "Medellín Cartel" (メデジンカルテル, "Medejin Karuteru"); Special 33. "Crazy Park" (CRAZY PARK, "Crazy Park"); 314. "Legend of the Black Giant" (ブラックジャイアント伝説, "Burakku Jaianto densetsu")
103	August 4, 1997	4-8458-0103-5
323. "Memories of Moscow" (モスクワの記憶, "Mosukuwa no kioku"); 321. "15-34" (15-34, "15-34"); Special 35. "Those Who Enforce Justice" (正義を行なう者, "Seigi o okonau mono")
104	October 5, 1997	4-8458-0104-3
318. "Bionic Soldier" (バイオニック・ソルジャー, "Baionikku Sorujā"); 317. "Black Star" (黒い星, "Kuroi hoshi"); 325. "Wu and Yue in the Same Boat" (呉越同舟, "Goetsu dōshū")
105	January 5, 1998	4-8458-0105-1
324. "Request from a Basque" (バスク・空白の依頼, "Basuku kūhaku no irai"); 326. "Hati at 90° N" (北緯九十度のハッティ, "Hokui kyūjū do no Hatti"); 319. "Eye of God" (神の眼力, "Kami no ganriki")
106	May 6, 1998	4-8458-0106-X
328. "Best Bank II - Offside Trap" (ベストバンクII オフサイド・トラップ, "Besuto Banku II Ofusaido torappu"); 322. "Wasteland of Straight Lines and Curves" (直線と曲線の荒野, "Chokusen to kyokusen no kōya"); Special 34. "Blood Sample G" (血液サンプルG, "Ketsueki sanpuru G")
107	June 25, 1998	4-8458-0107-8
333. "Power to the People" (力は我々にあり, "Chikara wa wareware ni ari"); 329. "Gecko Eavesdropping" (守宮の盗聴, "Yamori no tōchō"); 327. "Knights of the Round Table" (円卓の騎士団, "Entaku no kishidan")
108	August 4, 1998	4-8458-0108-6
330. "White Imperial Army" (白い皇軍, "Shiroi kōgun"); Special 36. "Ash's Best Day" (アッシュ最良の日, "Asshu sairyō no hi"); Special 39. "A Fierce Southern Current - Strange Tale of G Funds" (潮流激る南沙 -G資金異聞-, "Chōryū geki ru Nansa -G shikin ibun-")
109	October 5, 1998	4-8458-0109-4
334. "50-Year Solitude" (五十年の孤独, "Gojū-nen no kodoku"); Special 37. "Snow Demon" (雪上の悪魔, "Setsujō no akuma"); 331. "13 Count" (13カウント, "13 kaunto")
110	December 5, 1998	4-8458-0110-8
332. "Japan Original" (ジャパン・オリジナル, "Japan orijinaru"); 335. "Arm of Angel and Devil" (天使と悪魔の“腕”, "Tenshi to akuma no 'ude'"); 338. "Cold Blooded Catherine" (冷血キャサリン, "Reiketsu Kyasarin")
111	January 5, 1999	4-8458-0111-6
342. "Fake Empty Coordinates X" (偽空座標X, "Gisō kūzahyō X"); Special 40. "1 Second Out of 36,000" (36000秒分の1秒, "36,000-byō-bun no 1-byō"); Special 41. "Black Comm" (黒い通信, "Kuroi tsūshin"); 336. "Mark's Request" (マークのリクエスト, "Māku no rikuesuto")
112	April 26, 1999	4-8458-0112-4
340. "Saint of the Stench of Death" (死臭の聖者, "Shishū no seija"); Special 43. "Ghost from 50 Years" (50年目の亡霊, "50-nen-me no bōrei"); 339. "Stinger" (スティンガー, "Sutingā"); Special 38. "Sniper Street" (スナイパーストリート, "Sunaipā sutorīto")
113	August 5, 1999	4-8458-0113-2
337. "Murder Manual" (殺人マニュアル, "Satsujin manyuaru"); Special 42. "Amur's Sanction" (アムールの制裁, "Amūru no seisai"); 344. "Empire on the Sand" (砂上の帝国, "Sajō no teikoku")
114	October 3, 1999	4-8458-0114-0
343. "Pathogen Level 4" (病原体・レベル4, "Byōgentai reberu 4"); 346. "Request from King Godwin" (国王ゴードインの依頼, "Kokuō Gōdoin no irai"); 186. "American Dream" (アメリカンドリーム, "Amerikan dorīmu")
115	January 3, 2000	4-8458-0115-9
350. "Okinawa Syndrome" (沖縄シンドローム, "Okinawa shindorōmu"); 348. "Deng Xiaoping's X-Day" (鄧小平のXデー, "Tō Shōhei no X dē"); 351. "Trembling Baton" (震えるタクト, "Furueru takuto")
116	May 1, 2000	4-8458-0116-7
345. "Operation 'E'" (“E”工作, "'E' kōsaku"); Special 44. "God Hand" (神の手, "Kami no te"); 352. "The Thirteenth Juror" (13人目の陪審員, "13-nin-me no baishin-in"); 341. "Distant Neighbor" (遠い隣人, "Tōi rinjin")
117	August 5, 2000	4-8458-0117-5
353. "Information Game" (情報遊戯, "Jōhō yūgi"); 349. "Chimney Ship of the North Sea" (北海の煙突船, "Hokkai no entotsu-sen"); Special 48. "Full Mark" (フルマーク, "Furu māku")
118	October 5, 2000	4-8458-0118-3
Special 45. "Target at Dawn" (未明の標的, "Mimei no hyōteki"); 347. "Legacy" (遺作, "Isaku"); Special 47. "Old Lion" (老いた獅子, "Oita shishi"); 355. "Last Jihad" (ラストジハード, "Rasuto jihādo")
119	January 4, 2001	4-8458-0119-1
354. "White Dragon Rising" (白龍昇り立つ, "Hakuryū nobori tatsu"); 360. "The Wrong Man" (間違われた男, "Machigawareta otoko"); 356. "Death to the Coward" (臆病者に死を, "Okubyō-sha ni shi o")
120	May 5, 2001	4-8458-0120-5
358. "False Stars and Stripes" (偽りの星条旗, "Itsuwari no seijō-ki"); Special 46. "Milky White Darkness" (乳白の闇, "Nyūhaku no yami"); 357. "End-of-Century Hollywood" (世紀末ハリウッド, "Seiki-matsu Hariuddo")
121	August 5, 2001	4-8458-0121-3
359. "Counterfeit Workshop" (贋作工房, "Gansaku kōbō"); Special 50. "Sniper on the 13 Steps" (13階段の狙撃, "13 kaidan no sogeki"); 361. "Over the Sky" (オーバー・ザ・スカイ, "Ōbā za Sukai")
122	October 5, 2001	4-8458-0122-1
363. "Risky Business" (リスキー・ビジネス, "Risukī Bijinesu"); Special 51. "Professional" (PROFESSIONAL, "Professional"); 364. "The Gun at Am Shara" (アム・シャラーの砲身, "Amu Sharā no hōshin")
123	January 5, 2002	4-8458-0123-X
371. "Underground Over the Sky 2" (アンダーグラウンド オーバー・ザ・スカイ2, "Andāguraundo Ōbā za Sukai 2"); 362. "Mission in Hell" (ミッション・イン・ヘル, "Misshon in Heru")
124	May 5, 2002	4-8458-0124-8
369. "English Rose" (イングリッシュ・ローズ, "Ingurisshu Rōzu"); Special 49. "Taboo" (禁じられた言葉, "Kinjirareta kotoba"); 366. "Eve of the Handover" (返還前夜, "Henkan zen'ya")
125	August 5, 2002	4-8458-0125-6
365. "Hostage" (人質HOSTAGE, "Hitojichi HOSTAGE"); 370. "Bloodstained Prison" (血まみれの刑務所, "Chimamire no keimusho"); 368. "Forest of Pillaging" (略奪の森林, "Ryakudatsu no shinrin")
126	October 5, 2002	4-8458-0126-4
372. "Smile of the Sphinx" (スフィンクスの微笑, "Sufinkusu no bishō"); 367. "Zero Emission" (ゼロ・エミッション 排ガスゼロ, "Zero Emisshon haigasu zero"); Special 52. "Happy End" (HAPPY END, "Happy End")
127	January 5, 2003	4-8458-0127-2
376. "Stumbling in Timor" (ティモールの蹉跌, "Timōru no satetsu"); 374. "Shutter" (シャッター, "Shattā"); Special 53. "Pig at the Bottom of the Sea" (海底の豚, "Kaitei no buta")
128	May 5, 2003	4-8458-0128-0
380. "Staged Nation" (演出国家, "Enshutsu kokka"); 375. "S·F·Z" (S・F・Z, "S·F·Z"); 378. "Three Million Postcards" (300万通の絵葉書, "300-man-tsū no ehagaki")
129	August 5, 2003	4-8458-0127-2
373. "Final Code" (最終暗号, "Saishū angō"); Special 54. "Symbol of Gratitude" (感謝の印, "Kansha no shirushi"); 379. "Light and Shadow of Vilnius" (ビリニュスの光と影, "Birinyusu no hikari to kage")
130	October 5, 2003	4-8458-0130-2
382. "Golden Dog" (黄金の犬, "Ōgon no inu"); 377. "One Minute Past Midnight" (死刑執行0:01AM, "Shikei shikkō 0:01AM"); Special 56. "Glass Fortress" (硝子の要塞, "Garasu no yōsai")
131	January 5, 2004	4-8458-0131-0
385. "The Sherlockian" (シャーロッキアン, "Shārokkian"); Special 55. "God's Droplet" (神の滴, "Kami no shizuku"); 381. "Between the Two Oceans" (両洋の狭間に, "Ryōyō no hazama ni")
132	May 5, 2004	4-8458-0132-9
383. "Privilege Is a Double-Edged Sword" (特権は諸刃の剣, "Tokken wa moroha no tsurugi"); 384. "Conditions for the New Pope" (新法王の条件, "Shin hōō no jōken"); 386. "Girl Sara" (少女サラ, "Shōjo Sara")
133	August 5, 2004	4-8458-0133-7
390. "Black Memory" (黒い記憶, "Kuroi kioku"); 387. "TMD Illusion" (戦域ミサイル防衛TMD幻影, "Sen'iki misairu bōei TMD gen'ei"); Special 57. "Cradle of the Führer" (総統の揺りかご, "Sōtō no yurikago")
134	October 5, 2004	4-8458-0134-5
389. "Pest War" (害虫戦争, "Gaichū sensō"); 391. "Patchwork Bees" (パッチワークの蜜蜂たち, "Patchiwāku no mitsubachi-tachi"); Special 59. "Altitude 7000 Meters" (高度7000メートル, "Kōdo 7000 mētoru")
135	January 4, 2005	4-8458-0135-3
388. "Double Meaning" (ダブル・ミーニング, "Daburu Mīningu"); Special 61. "Island Oil Slick Blockade" (列島油濁包囲網, "Retō yudaku hōi mō"); Special 58. "The Eighteen-Month Butterfly" (一年半の蝶, "Ichinen-han no chō"); 394. "ODA Strange Tale" (ODA異聞, "ODA ibun")
136	May 5, 2005	4-8458-2674-7
396. "Jesus' Tears" (涙するイエス, "Namida suru Iesu"); 393. "2000.2.29" (2000.2.29, "2000.2.29"); Special 60. "Atomic Aquaculture" (原子養殖, "Genshi yōshoku")
137	August 5, 2005	4-8458-2675-5
395. "Wolves of the Caucasus" (カフカーズの群狼, "Kafukāzu no gunrō"); 398. "Chance of Survival 0.13%" (生存確率0.13%", "Seizon kakuritsu 0.13%"); 392. "Synchrotron BESSY-1" (シンクロトロンBESSY-1, "Shinkurotoron BESSY-1")
138	October 5, 2005	4-8458-2676-3
397. "Twilight in Kashmir" (黄昏のカシミール, "Tasogare no Kashimīru"); 403. "Talkative Coin" (饒舌なコイン, "Jōzetsu na koin"); Special 62. "Florida Chase" (フロリダ・チェイス, "Fururida Cheisu")
139	January 5, 2006	4-8458-2677-1
Special 63. "Rusted Gold" (錆びた黄金, "Sabita ōgon"); 399. "Secret Pact of the Underworld King" (冥王の密約, "Meiō no mitsuyaku"); Special 65. "Testimony of Flames" (炎の証言, "Honō no shōgen"); 404. "Fearless" (フィアレス, "Fiaresu")
140	May 5, 2006	4-8458-3001-9
400. "Pandora's Coffin" (パンドラの柩, "Pandora no hitsugi"); 402. "Squirming of 100 Million" (一億人の蠢き, "Ichioku-nin no ugomeki"); 405. "Quiet Grassland" (静かなる草原, "Shizuka naru sōgen")
141	August 5, 2006	4-8458-3002-7
407. "Queen of Mystery 2" (ミステリーの女王・2, "Misuterī no joō 2"); Special 64. "Red Trophy" (赤いトロフィー, "Akai torofī"); 401. "When the Earth Moves" (大地動く時, "Daichi ugoku toki"); Special 66. "Flagburner" (星条旗を撃つ, "Seijō-ki o utsu")
142	October 5, 2006	4-8458-3003-5
410. "Iris, Surface!" (イリスク浮上せよ, "Irisuku fujō seyo"); 406. "Gene War" (遺伝子戦争, "Idenshi sensō"); Special 68. "Tiger of Tamil" (タミルの虎, "Tamiru no tora")
143	January 5, 2007	4-8458-3004-3
411. "One Hundred Mao Zedongs" (百人の毛沢東, "Hyaku-nin no Mō Takutō"); Special 67. "Silicon Island" (シリコンアイランド, "Shirikon Airando"); 409. "Omen of Sudden Death" (突然死の予兆, "Totsuzen-shi no yochō"); Special 69. "Demon Strait" (魔の海峡, "Ma no kaikyō")
144	May 5, 2007	4-8458-3005-1
417. "God's Ear - Echelon" (神の耳・エシュロン, "Kami no mimi Eshuron"); 414. "Holiday in the Park" (ホリデー・イン・ザ・パーク, "Horidē in za Pāku"); 413. "Peeled Gilding" (剥がれた鍍金, "Hagareta tokkin")
145	August 5, 2007	4-8458-3006-X
412. "John 11:10" (ヨハネ伝十一章十節, "Yohane-den jūichi-shō jussetsu"); 415. "Suspect Togo" (容疑者トウゴウ, "Yōgi-sha Tōgō"); 408. "Night of the Murder Play" (殺人劇の夜, "Satsujin-geki no yoru"); 422. "Stranger" (ストレンジャー, "Sutorenjā")
146	October 5, 2007	4-8458-3007-8
416. "By Ancient Law" (いにしえの法に拠りて, "Inishie no hō ni yorite"); 419. "Village Jack" (ヴィレッジ・ジャック, "Virejji Jakku"); Special 70. "Woman with a Boomerang" (ブーメランを持つ女, "Būmeran o motsu onna")
147	January 5, 2008	4-8458-3008-6
424. "Distorted Wheel" (歪んだ車輪, "Yuganda sharin"); 421. "Biles Chase" (バイルス・チェイス, "Bairesu Cheisu"); Special 71. "Three Snipers" (三人の狙撃手, "San-nin no sogeki-shu"); Special 72. "13 Phobia" (13恐怖症, "13 kyōfushō")
148	May 5, 2008	4-8458-3009-4
418. "Armored Soldier SDR2" (装甲兵SDR2, "Sōkō-hei SDR2"); 425. "Offering to the Dragon" (龍への供物, "Ryū e no kumotsu"); 420. "Frozen Flame" (凍った炎, "Kōtta honō")
149	August 5, 2008	4-8458-3010-8
423. "AK-100 vs M-16 Showdown" (激突!AK-100vsM-16, "Gekitotsu! AK-100 vs M-16"); 428. "Extreme Target" (極限標的, "Kyokugen hyōteki"); Special 73. "Pinhead Shoot" (ピンヘッド・シュート, "Pinheddo Shūto")
150	October 5, 2008	4-8458-3011-6
426. "End of the Banquet" (宴の終焉, "En no shūen"); 430. "Scented Jewel" (香りの宝石, "Kaori no hōseki"); Special 74. "Future Prediction Shooting" (未来予測射撃, "Mirai yosoku shageki")
151	December 5, 2008	978-4-8458-3012-1
431. "Labyrinth of Ubiquity" (ユビキタスの迷路, "Yubikitasu no meiro"); Special 75. "Last Drink" (最後の酒, "Saigo no sake"); Special 77. "1-Inch Illusion" (1インチの錯覚, "1 inchi no sakkaku"); 427. "Bomb Maniac" (爆弾魔, "Bakudan ma")
152	April 5, 2009	978-4-8458-3013-8
429. "True Berlin Citizen" (真のベルリン市民, "Shin no Berurin shimin"); Special 76. "A Woman's View" (ある女の視界, "Aru onna no shikai"); 435. "Sun on the Ground" (地上の太陽, "Chijō no taiyō")
153	July 5, 2009	978-4-8458-3014-5
437. "Last Great Game" (ラストグレートゲーム, "Rasuto Gurēto Gēmu"); 432. "MASK" (MASK, "MASK"); 434. "Fate That Descended" (舞い降りた運命, "Maiorita unmei")
154	September 5, 2009	978-4-8458-3015-2
433. "The Hero Wins" (勇者が勝利する, "Yūsha ga shōri suru"); Special 79. "Barren Land" (荒んだ大地, "Aranda daichi"); 438. "All-Purpose Vector VOGUE" (万能ベクター・VOGUE, "Bannō bekutā VOGUE"); Special 78. "Sanctuary" (サンクチュアリ, "Sankuchuari")
155	December 5, 2009	978-4-8458-3016-9
440. "PKO" (PKO, "PKO"); Special 80. "Recurrence - Guillain-Barré Syndrome" (再発・ギランバレー症候群, "Saihatsu Giran-Barē shōkōgun"); 436. "One Shot, One Life" (一射一生, "Issha isshō")
156	April 4, 2010	978-4-8458-3017-6
442. "Frozen Land" (極寒の大地, "Gokkan no daichi"); 444. "3/7" (3/7, "3/7"); 439. "FIRE!" (FIRE!, "FIRE!")
157	July 5, 2010	978-4-8458-3018-3
446. "Corten Rhapsody" (コルタン狂想曲, "Korutan kyōsōkyoku"); 441. "Payback" (ペイ・バック, "Pei Bakku"); Special 81. "Between Europe and Asia" (欧亜の狭間, "Ōa no hazama")
158	September 5, 2010	978-4-8458-3019-0
448. "Dirty Wing" (ダーティー・ウイング, "Dātī Uingu"); 443. "Those Who Fish on the Battlefield" (戦場に漁る者, "Senjō ni asaru mono"); Special 83. "Vanishing Sea Area" (消滅海域, "Shōmetsu kaiiki"); Special 84. "River That Divides Life and Death" (生と死を分かつ川, "Sei to shi o wakatsu kawa")
159	December 5, 2010	978-4-8458-3020-6
449. "Fortress on Ice" (氷上の砦, "Hyōjō no toride"); Special 82. "When the Town Dies" (町が死にゆく時, "Machi ga shiniyuku toki"); 445. "Airport Island" (エアポート・アイランド, "Eapōto Airando")
160	April 5, 2011	978-4-8458-3021-3
451. "Asian Heritage" (亜細亜の遺産, "Ajia no isan"); 452. "Asian Heritage Continued" (亜細亜の遺産その後, "Ajia no isan sono go"); 447. "Chameleon Unit" (カメレオン部隊, "Kamereon butai")
161	July 5, 2011	978-4-8458-3022-0
450. "Paraiba Blue" (パライバ・ブルー, "Paraiba Burū"); Special 87. "The Mobs" (THE MOBS, "The Mobs"); 453. "Request on Hold" (依頼保留, "Irai horyū")
162	September 5, 2011	978-4-8458-3023-7
456. "Nomonhan Cover-Up" (ノモンハンの隠蔽, "Nomonhan no inpei"); 458. "Mine at Sea" (海の鉱山, "Umi no kōzan"); Special 85. "The Chicken Bleeds" (鶏は血を流す, "Niwatori wa chi o nagasu")
163	December 5, 2011	978-4-8458-3024-4
454. "Beholder" (BEHOLDER, "Beholder"); 459. "Global Pandemic" (世界的大流行, "Sekai-teki dairuryū"); Special 86. "Princess's Tears" (プリンセスの涙, "Purinsesu no namida")
164	April 5, 2012	978-4-8458-3025-1
457. "Butterfly of Beijing" (北京の蝶, "Pekin no chō"); 455. "Unforgivable False Accusation" (冤罪許すまじ, "Enzai yurusumaji"); Special 89. "One Shot" (ONE SHOT, "One Shot")
165	July 5, 2012	978-4-8458-3026-8
460. "Oligarch's Retaliation" (オリガルヒの報復, "Oligarhi no hōfuku"); 463. "Nightmare of Darfur" (ダルフールの悪夢, "Darufūru no akumu"); Special 88. "Spiral" (螺旋, "Rasens")
166	September 5, 2012	978-4-8458-3027-5
461. "Close-Range Sniping" (至近狙撃, "Shikin sogeki"); 464. "Ring Fortress" (環の城, "Wa no shiro"); Special 92. "One Drop of Angel" (天使の一滴, "Tenshi no itteki"); Special 90. "Ambush" (伏兵, "Fukuhei")
167	December 5, 2012	978-4-8458-3028-2
467. "Bolivar II Assassination Plot" (ボリバルII世暗殺計画, "Boribaru Ni-sei ansatsu keikaku"); 472. "Burning Iceberg" (燃える氷塊, "Moeru hyōkai"); Special 91. "Dollhouse" (人形の家, "Ningyō no ie")
168	April 5, 2013	978-4-8458-3029-9
462. "Danube Line Labyrinth" (ドナウ・ライン迷路, "Donau Rain meiro"); 465. "Replay" (リプレイ, "Ripurei")
169	July 5, 2013	978-4-8458-3030-5
471. "Far East Atrocity" (極東の凶行, "Kyokutō no kyōkō"); Special 94. "Dogman's Nose" (ドッグマンの鼻, "Dogguman no hana"); 473. "Delete G" (デリートG, "Derīto G")
170	September 5, 2013	978-4-8458-3031-2
Special 93. "Twin Dragon Sniping Directive" (双龍狙撃指令, "Sōryū sogeki shirei"); 474. "Sleep at the Bottom of History" (歴史の底に眠れ, "Rekishi no soko ni nemure"); 468. "Micro Terrorist" (マイクロテロリスト, "Maikuro terorisuto")
171	December 5, 2013	978-4-8458-3032-9
466. "Mission of the Red May" (赤い五月の使命, "Akai gogatsu no shimei"); 469. "TATTOO" (TATTOO, "TATTOO"); 479. "Fool's Gun" (愚か者の銃, "Orokamono no jū")
172	April 5, 2014	978-4-8458-3033-6
476. "Analyze Ukraine" (アナライズ・ウクライナ, "Anaraizu Ukuraina"); 470. "Remnants of East Germany" (東ドイツの残骸, "Higashi Doitsu no zangai")
173	July 5, 2014	978-4-8458-3500-3
483. "Heinrich's Law" (ハインリッヒの法則, "Hainrihhi no hōsoku"); Special 95. "Continuing Corpse" (生き続ける遺体, "Iki tsuzukeru itai"); 480. "Nostradamus's Prophecy Box" (ノストーラの予言匣, "Nosutōra no yogen-bako")
174	September 5, 2014	978-4-8458-3501-0
478. "Terror in the Far North" (極北のテロル, "Kyokuhoku no teroru"); 475. "Holy Bank" (聖なる銀行, "Seinaru ginkō"); Special 96. "Resurrection - Rakshasa Bird" (復活・羅刹鳥, "Fukkatsu Rasetsu-chō")
175	December 5, 2014	978-4-8458-3502-7
484. "Quiet Meadow" (不可能侵入, "Fukanō shinnyū"); 481. "Night of the Murder Play" (殺人投資, "Satsujin tōshi"); 477. "Whistle That Calls Death" (死を呼ぶ汽笛, "Shi o yobu kiteki")
176	April 5, 2015	978-4-8458-3503-4
493. "Faceless Grim Reaper" (顔のない死神, "Kao no nai shinigami"); Special 98. "Deadly 0.5 Seconds" (必殺の0.5秒, "Hissatsu no 0.5-byō"); 487. "Azhdahaka's Feathers" (アジ・ダハーカの羽, "Aji Dahāka no hane")
177	July 5, 2015	978-4-8458-3504-1
485. "Reincarnation of Desire" (欲望の輪廻転生, "Yokubō no rinne tensei"); 482. "Appraisal of Lost Pigeon Blood" (ピジョンブラッド失落の鑑別書, "Pijon Buraddo shitsuraku no kanbetsusho"); Special 97. "Summer Old Man" (夏の老人, "Natsu no rōjin")
178	September 5, 2015	978-4-8458-3505-8
489. "Azhdahaka's Feathers" (魑魅魍魎の井戸, "Chimimōryō no ido"); 491. "Arena di Verona" (アレーナ・ディ・ヴェローナ, "Arēna di Verōna"); 486. "Permitted Life" (許された命, "Yurusareta inochi")
179	December 5, 2015	978-4-8458-3506-5
488. "Eve of Panic" (恐慌前夜, "Kyōkō zen'ya"); Special 99. "Suspicious Pacemaker" (疑惑のペースメーカー, "Giwaku no pēsumēkā"); 496. "End of the Feast" (グアンタナモの地雷原, "Guantanamo no jirai-gen"); Special 100. "Break the Beast's Claws" (獣の爪を折れ, "Kemono no tsume o ore")
180	April 19, 2016	978-4-8458-3507-2
494. "Giza Scandal" (ギザの醜聞, "Giza no shūbun"); 490. "Who Could Have Done It" (誰がそれを成し得たのか, "Dare ga sore o nashi eta no ka"); Special 101. "Stairway to Death" (死への階, "Shi e no kai")
181	July 19, 2016	978-4-8458-3508-9
497. "Lou-lan, the Wandering Grim Reaper" (楼蘭・さまよえる死神, "Rōran samayoeru shinigami"); 499. "Decline of a Famous Car" (凋落した名車, "Chōraku shita meisha")
182	September 19, 2016	978-4-8458-3509-6
495. "Epidemic at 10,000 Meters" (高度1万メートルのエピデミック, "Kōdo ichiman mētoru no epidemikku"); 492. "Revived Latent Image" (甦る潜像, "Yomigaeru senzō"); 501. "Disguised Request" (偽装依頼, "Gisō irai")
183	December 19, 2016	978-4-8458-3510-2
502. "Chimera's Power Source" (キメラの動力, "Kimera no dōryoku"); 498. "Nation in a Cage" (檻の国, "Ori no kuni")
184	April 19, 2017	978-4-8458-3511-9
503. "ACT-X" (ACT-X, "ACT-X"); 512. "Japan-ASEAN Conference" (日・ASEAN会議, "Nichi ASEAN kaigi"); Special 103. "Zinnemann's One Hour" (ジンネマンの1時間, "Jinneman no 1-jikan")
185	July 19, 2017	978-4-8458-3512-6
506. "Venom Fangs in the Sky" (天空の毒牙, "Tenkū no dokuga"); 500. "The First Sniper" (史上初の狙撃者 ザ・ファースト・スナイパー, "Shijō hatsu no sogeki-sha Za Fāsuto Sunaipā"); Special 102. "Cannibal Bacteria of the Caribbean" (カリブの人喰い菌, "Karibu no hito-kui kin")
186	September 19, 2017	978-4-8458-3513-3
504. "Brother Hood - Bonds" (BROTHER HOOD・絆, "Brother Hood - Kizuna"); 509. "Crisis of the Other-Dimensional Experiment" (異次元実験の危機, "Ijigen jikken no kiki"); Special 104. "Forbidden Scope" (禁忌のスコープ, "Kinki no sukōpu")
187	December 19, 2017	978-4-8458-3514-0
507. "Arctic Sea Route" (極北航路, "Kyokuhoku kōro"); 505. "Target Is the Cheerful Demon" (標的は陽気な悪魔, "Hyōteki wa yōki na akuma"); Special 105. "The Vanished Manuscript" (消えた原稿, "Kieta genkō")
188	April 19, 2018	978-4-8458-3515-7
508. "Messenger from the Canopy" (キャノピーからの使者, "Kyanopī kara no shisha"); 515. "Scenario of the Giants" (巨人共のシナリオ, "Kyojin-domo no shinario"); 510. "Death of a Good Man" (善人の死, "Zenjin no shi")
189	July 19, 2018	978-4-8458-3516-4
513. "G13 File" (G13ファイル, "G13 fairu"); 517. "Micro Oil Field" (ミクロの油田, "Mikuro no yuden")
190	September 19, 2018	978-4-8458-3517-1
511. "Svalbard - Cold Coast" (スヴァールバル 冷たい海岸, "Suvārubaru tsumetai kaigan"); 514. "Man of Diplomatic Legend" (外交伝説の男, "Gaikō densetsu no otoko"); 516. "Friends" (FRENDS, "Friends")
191	December 8, 2018	978-4-8458-3518-8
519. "Sniper at 10,000 km" (1万キロの狙撃, "Ichiman kiro no sogeki"); 518. "Beyond the Meteor Shower" (流星雨の彼方で, "Ryūsei-u no kanata de")
192	April 19, 2019	978-4-8458-3519-5
520. "Undiagnosed Illness" (未病, "Mibyō"); 526. "Nation Without an Army" (軍隊を持たぬ国, "Guntai o motanu kuni")
193	July 19, 2019	978-4-8458-3520-1
524. "Bloodstained Maha" (血まみれのマハ, "Chimamire no Maha"); 523. "The Snipers" (スナイパーたち, "Sunaipā-tachi"); Special 106. "The Other Professional" (もうひとりのプロフェッショナル, "Mō hitori no purofesshonaru")
194	September 19, 2019	978-4-8458-3521-8
525. "Faceless Man" (顔のない男, "Kao no nai otoko"); 528. "Bitter Chocolate" (苦いチョコレート, "Nigai chokorēto"); 533. "Death Pool" (DEATH POOL, "Death Pool")
195	December 19, 2019	978-4-8458-3522-5
527. "Persian Gulf Crisis - Presidential Election Strange Tale" (ペルシャ湾危機大統領選異聞, "Pershia-wan kiki daitōryō-sen ibun"); 534. "The Man Called Father" (父という男, "Chichi to iu otoko"); 521. "Stock" (STOCK, "Stock")
196	April 17, 2020	978-4-8458-3523-2
529. "Corroded Steel" (腐食鉄鋼, "Fushoku tekkō"); 538. "World Heritage Standing in Shadow" (影に立つ世界遺産, "Kage ni tatsu sekai isan"); 522. "The 13th Guest" (13番目の客, "13-ban-me no kyaku")
197	July 18, 2020	978-4-8458-3524-9
532. "Trembling Ascetic" (震える修験者, "Furueru shugen-ja"); 531. "Silent Partner" (寡黙なパートナー, "Kamoku na pātonā"); 541. "PTSD" (PTSD, "PTSD")
198	September 18, 2020	978-4-8458-3525-6
536. "God's Iron Hammer" (神の鉄槌, "Kami no tettsui"); 535. "Gun of the Land of Forests and Lakes" (森と湖の国の銃, "Mori to mizuumi no kuni no jū"); 547. "Cannabis Business" (大麻ビジネス, "Taima bijinesu")
199	December 4, 2020	978-4-8458-3526-3
537. "Octopus Fake Lure" (オクトパスの疑似餌, "Okutopasu no giji esa"); 542. "Black-and-White Direction" (黒白の演出, "Kuroshiro no enshutsu")
200	April 5, 2021	978-4-8458-3527-0
540. "Land of the Dead and the Stench" (亡者と死臭の大地, "Mōja to shishū no daichi"); 539. "Boy Who Called a Miracle" (奇跡を呼んだ少年, "Kiseki o yonda shōnen"); 544. "European Revival - EU Automobile War" (欧州再生EU自動車戦争, "Ōshū saisei EU jidōsha sensō")
201	July 5, 2021	978-4-8458-5758-6
548. "Final Currency Battle" (最終通貨の攻防, "Saishū tsūka no kōbō"); 552. "Return to Suffering" (受難の帰日, "Junan no kinichi"); 543. "Summer of the 13-Year Cicada" (13年蝉の夏, "13-nen semi no natsu")
202	September 6, 2021	978-4-8458-3528-7
553. "Starving Ghosts of the Gulf of Aden" (アデン湾の餓鬼, "Aden-wan no gaki"); 530. "Beast's Den" (獣の穴, "Kemono no ana"); 545. "White Group Memoir" (白団回顧録, "Hakudan kaikoroku")
203	December 6, 2021	978-4-8458-3529-4
555. "Rommel General's Treasure" (ロンメル将軍の財宝, "Ronmeru shōgun no zaihō"); 546. "At an Unfamiliar BAR" (見知らぬBARで, "Mishiranu BAR de"); 549. "Repossession - Aircraft Recovery Operation!" (REPOSSESSION 航空機奪還作戦!, "Repossession kōkūki dakkan sakusen!")
204	April 5, 2022	978-4-8458-3530-0
550. "Fate of a Great Power" (運命の大国, "Unmei no taikoku"); 557. "33+G" (33+G, "33+G")
205	July 5, 2022	978-4-8458-3531-7
554. "Big Data" (ビッグ・データ, "Biggu dēta"); 551. "Aborted Case" (未遂案件, "Misui anken"); 558. "Drone Revolution" (ドローン革命, "Dorōn kakumei")
206	September 5, 2022	978-4-8458-3532-4
562. "G's Gene" (Gの遺伝子, "G no idenshi"); 559. "Abandoned Town" (置き去りの街, "Okizari no machi"); 556. "Dancer from Hell" (地獄のダンサー, "Jigoku no dansā")
207	December 5, 2022	978-4-8458-3533-1
565. "Armstrong's Last Will" (アームストロングの遺言, "Āmusutorongu no yuigon"); 561. "The Great Game" (The Great Game, "The Great Game"); 560. "Jomon Fire" (縄文の火, "Jōmon no hi")
208	April 5, 2023	978-4-8458-6207-8
564. "Ultimate Weapon Asteroid Bomb" (最終兵器小惑星爆弾, "Saishū heiki shōwakusei bakudan"); 567. "i-Construction" (アイ・コンストラクション, "Ai konsutorakushon"); 569. "Morning of Restored Diplomatic Relations" (国交回復の朝, "Kokkō kaifuku no asa")
209	July 5, 2023	978-4-8458-6253-5
566. "Woman with the Kalmia Hair Ornament" (カルミアの髪飾りの女, "Karumia no kamikazari no onna"); 563. "Lovebird" (ラブバード, "Rabubādo"); 571. "Futuro de Bolivia" (フトゥーロ・デ・ボリビア, "Futūro de Boribia")
210	September 5, 2023	978-4-8458-6279-5
568. "Ninja on the G Battlefield" (G戦場のニンジャ, "G senjō no ninja"); 570. "The Hero Sleeps in the Wind" (英雄は、風の中で眠る, "Eiyū wa, kaze no naka de nemuru")
211	December 5, 2023	978-4-8458-6484-3
579. "Overrun" (オーバーラン, "Ōbāran"); 581. "Silent Submarine - Shield of the Deep" (深海の盾・無音潜水艦, "Shinkai no tate - muon sensuikan")
212	April 5, 2024	978-4-8458-6593-2
573. "Sheep of Ryukyu" (琉球の羊, "Ryūkyū no hitsuji"); 574. "Tears That Freeze" (涙も凍る, "Namida mo kōru"); 575. "Witch's Bullet" (魔女の銃弾, "Majo no jūdan")
213	July 5, 2024	978-4-8458-6663-2
576. "Dream Country" (夢の国, "Yume no kuni"); 577. "Earth Dragon of Chongqing" (重慶の土龍(どりゅう), "Jūkei no doryū"); 578. "Deception at Sea" (洋上の偽り, "Yōjō no itsuwari")
214	September 5, 2024	978-4-8458-6687-8
572. "Narcotics Subway" (麻薬地下鉄, "Mayaku chikatetsu"); 580. "Man Standing on the Building" (ビルに立つ男, "Biru ni tatsu otoko"); 582. "Knight of Malta" (マルタの騎士(カヴァリエーレ), "Maruta no kishi (kavarieere)"); 586. "Panda Diplomacy" (パンダ外交, "Panda gaikō")
215	December 5, 2024	978-4-8458-6767-7
583. "White Hacker" (ホワイトハッカー, "Howaito hakkā"); 585. "Hell's Hover Race" (地獄のホバートレース, "Jigoku no Hobāto reisu")
216	April 4, 2025	978-4-8458-6884-1
587. "Girl of Golgotha" (ゴルゴダの少女, "Gorugoda no shōjo"); 588. "Nile Ambition" (ナイルの野望, "Nairu no yabō")
217	July 4, 2025	978-4-8458-6930-5
590. "Sword of Qatar" (カタールの剣, "Katāru no ken"); 584. "Apprentice of the Information Broker" (情報屋の弟子, "Jōhō-ya no deshi"); 594. "Caribbean Hegemony" (カリブ海の覇権, "Karibu-kai no haken"); 589. "Marksman Selection Shooter" (マークスマン選抜射手, "Mākusuman senbatsu shashu")
218	September 5, 2025	978-4-8458-6959-6
593. "AI Metis" (AIメティス, "AI Metisu"); 596. "Hand of the Dead" (死者の手, "Shisha no te")
219	December 5, 2025	978-4-8458-7032-5
592. "Multiple Rounds Simultaneous Impact" (複数弾同時着弾, "Fukusū-dan dōji chakudan"); 591. "Unlucky Woman" (運の悪い女, "Un no warui onna"); 597. "Disillusioned Atlantis" (幻滅のアトランティス, "Genmetsu no Atorantisu)
220	April 6, 2026	978-4-8458-7090-5
600. "Bride with Silver Wings" (銀翼の花嫁, "Gin'yoku no hanayome"); 598. "Roar of Moldova" (モルドバの咆哮(さけび), "Morudoba no hōkō (sakebi)"); 595. "Woman of Paradise" (楽園の女, "Rakuen no onna")
221	July 6, 2026	978-4-8458-7192-6

== Chapters not yet in Tankōbon format ==
- 599. "Who Is the Coward?" (臆病者は誰か?, "Okubyō-sha wa dare ka?")
- 601. "Unhealable Wound" (癒されぬ傷, "Iyasarenu kizu")
- 602. "Forest of Mapless Evil Spirits" (地図無き悪霊の森, "Chizu naki akuryō no mori")
- 603. "Pandora's Jar" (パンドラの甕(かめ), "Pandora no kame (kame)")
- 604. "RBG Nightmare" (RBGの悪夢, "RBG no akumu")
- 605. "On the Other Side of the Earth" (地球の裏側で, "Chikyū no uragawa de")
- 606. "Easy Job" (EASY JOB, "Easy Job")
- 607. "Spring of the Armadillo" (アルマジロの春, "Arumajiro no haru")
- 608. "Jigsaw Code" (ジグソー・コード, "Jigusō kōdo")
- 609. "Sniper Without a Request" (依頼なき狙撃, "Irai naki sogeki")
- 610. "Determination Is Everything" (覚悟がすべて, "Kakugo ga subete")
- 611. "Plant Academy of Treachery" (逆心のプラントアカデミー, "Gyakushin no puranto akademī")
- 612. "Beyond Coincidence" (偶然の先に, "Gūzen no saki ni")
- 613. "Open Dialogue" (オープンダイアローグ, "Ōpun daiarōgu")
- 614. "Final Virus" (最終ウイルス, "Saishū uirusu")
- 615. "If the Pheasant Does Not Cry" (雉も鳴かずば, "Kiji mo nakazu ba")
- 616. "Lady Finger" (レディ・フィンガー, "Redi Fingā")
- 617. "Data Center Seizure" (データセンター奪取, "Dēta sentā dasshu")
- 618. "I Saw the Bird" (鳥を見た, "Tori o mita")
- 619. "Transcendent Technique Tsigane" (超絶技巧ツィガーヌ, "Chōzetsu gikō Tsīgānu")
- 620. "Last Laugh" (ラスト・ラフ, "Rasuto Rafu")
- 621. "Veterans Day" (ベテランズ・デイ, "Beteranzu Dei")
- 622. "From Darkness to Darkness" (闇から闇へ, "Yami kara yami e")
- 623. "G in the Thicket" (藪の中のG, "Yabu no naka no G")
- 624. "+ One-shot" (+ワンショット, "+ wan shotto")
- 625. "When the Alphorn Sounds" (アルプホルンが鳴る時, "Arupuhorun ga naru toki")
- 626. "Woman Who Was Looking at the Sea" (海を見ていた女, "Umi o mite ita onna")
- 627. "Judgment of the Blade" (刃の裁き, "Ha no sabaki")
- 628. "Funeral of Fog and Roses" (霧と薔薇の葬送, "Kiri to bara no sōsō")
- 629. "Beyond the Reversal" (逆転の先に, "Gyakuten no saki ni")
- 630. "Who Is the Grim Reaper?" (死神は誰?, "Shinigami wa dare?")
- 631. "Brothers of Honduras" (ホンジュラスの兄弟, "Honjurasu no kyōdai")
- 632. "Altruism and Death" (利他と死, "Rita to shi")
- 633. "Beyond Vice" (悪徳の彼方, "Akutoku no kanata")
- 634. "Zangezur Mechanized Corridor" (ザンゲズール機械化回廊, "Zangezūru kikaika kairō")
- 635. "Clash! Trailer Jack!" (激突・トレーラージャック！, "Gekitotsu torērā jakku!")
- 636. "Ghost of Deepfake" (ディープフェイクの亡霊, "Dīpufēiku no bōrei")
- 637. "Tears of the Jet Engine AL-31" (ジェットエンジンAL-31の涙, "Jetto enjin AL-31 no namida")
- 638. "Sorrowful Precognitive Dream" (哀しみの予知夢, "Kanashimi no yochi yume")
- 639. "Fabricated Assessment" (捏造されたアセスメント, "Netsuzō sa reta asesumento")
- 640. "Call the Dragon" (竜を呼ぶ, "Ryū o yobu")
- 641. "God Save the King" (ゴッド・セイブ・ザ・キング, "Goddo seibu za kingu")
- 642. "Women's Peace" (女の平和, "On'na no heiwa")
- 643. "Super Strength Warrior Ivanova" (怪力戦士イヴァノバ, "Kairiki senshi Ivanova")
- 644. "Shoot the Heart!" (心を撃て！, "Kokoro o ute!")
- 645. "Beyond Bankruptcy" (破綻の先に, "Hatan no saki ni")
- 646. "Medical Officer's Notebook" (医務官手帳, "Imukan techō")
- 647. "Bat Woman" (コウモリ女, "Kōmori on'na")

== Chapters left out from the books ==
These chapters have been left out completely from the SP tankōbon editions.

- 237. "Phantom Cultivation" (幻の栽培, "Maboroshi no saibai")

This chapter was pulled from reprints due to protests from the Iranian Embassy over the portrayal of the country and Ayatollah Khomeini within the story.

- 245. "Prisoner Swap Exchange" (スワップ 捕虜交換, "Suwappu horyo kōkan")

This chapter was originally pulled from the tankōbon editions due to the unfavorable portrayal of the Palestine Liberation Organization, but was later included in vol. 175 of the sōshūhen edition; in that edition, the PLO was substituted with a fictional, equivalent organization.

- 266. "Vatican Set" (バチカン・セット, "Bachikan setto")

This chapter was pulled from the tankōbon due to the portrayal of the Vatican, with money laundering and other criminal actions depicted within Vatican.

- Special 20. "Signpost of the Plague God" (疫病神の道標, "Yakubyō kami no dōhyō")

This chapter contained a case of an actor being blackmailed due to him testing positive for AIDS; it was likely pulled due to insensitivities regarding the disease. It is however, available in early editions of vol. 83 of the tankōbon edition.

- Special 32. "Indictment of the Iron Cross" (告発の鉄十字, "Kokuhatsu no tetsu jūji")

This chapter, dealing with a former Nazi doctor, featured an image of Duke Togo wearing a Nazi uniform.

== Viz Media English volumes ==
No.	English release date	English ISBN
1	February 27, 2006	978-1-4215-0251-9
364. "The Gun at Am Shara" (アム・シャラーの砲身, "Amu Sharā no hōshin"); 144. "Hit and Run" (ヒット・エンド・ラン, "Hitto endo ran")
2	April 18, 2006	978-1-4215-0382-0
290. "The Deaths of June 3rd" (6月3日の死, "6 gatsu 3 nichi no shi"); 88. "Hydra" (ヒドラ, "Hidora")
3	June 20, 2006	978-1-4215-0462-9
333. "Power to the People" (力は我々にあり, "Chikara wa wareware ni ari"); Special 39. "A Fierce Southern Current" (潮流激る南沙 -G資金異聞-, "Chōryū geki ru Nansa -G shikin ibun-")
4	August 15, 2006	978-1-4215-0463-6
137. "The Orbital Hit" (軌道上狙撃, "Kidō-jō sogeki"); 369. "English Rose" (イングリッシュ・ローズ, "Ingurisshu Rōzu")
5	October 18, 2006	978-1-4215-0464-3
301. "Way of the Wiseguy" (ワイズガイへの道, "Waizu gai e no dō"); 288. "Germany Is One" (ドイツはひとつ, "Doitsu wa hito-tsu")
6	December 19, 2006	978-1-4215-0465-0
377. "One Minute Past Midnight" (死刑執行0:01AM, "Shikei shikkō 0:01AM"); 179. "Zdrowas Maryjo" (ズドロナス・マリヨ, "Zudoronasu Mariyo")
7	February 20, 2007	978-1-4215-0962-4
319. "Eye of God" (神の眼力, "Kami no ganriki"); 126. "Far From an Era" (ピリオドの向こう, "Piriodo no mukō")
8	April 17, 2007	978-1-4215-0963-1
184. "Telepath" (テレパス, "Terepasu"); 139. "Gravestone in Sicily" (シシリー島の墓標, "Shishirī-tō no bohyō")
9	June 19, 2007	978-1-4215-0964-8
61. "Accidental" (アクシデンタル, "Akushidentaru"); 204. "Headhunter" (ヘッドハンター, "Heddo hantā")
10	August 21, 2007	978-1-4215-0965-5
213. "Wasteland" (2万5千年の荒野, "2 man 5 sen nen no kōya"); 249. "Route 95" (ルート95, "Rūto 95")
11	October 16, 2007	978-1-4215-0966-2
350. "Okinawa Syndrome" (沖縄シンドローム, "Okinawa shindorōmu"); 360. "The Wrong Man" (間違われた男, "Machigawareta otoko")
12	December 18, 2007	978-1-4215-0967-9
105. "Shadow of Death" (落日の死影, "Rakujitsu no shi kage"); 83. "The Dark-Skinned Sniper" (黒い肌の狙撃者, "Kuroi hada no sogeki-sha")
13	February 19, 2008	978-1-4215-1531-1
100. "The Serizawa Family Murders" (芹沢家殺人事件, "Serizawa-ka satsujin jiken"); Special 66. "Flagburner" (星条旗を撃つ, "Seijō-ki o utsu")
