= Sabu to Ichi Torimono Hikae =

Japanese manga and anime series

- Cover of series DVD box set, featuring the two main characters

佐武と市捕物控
- Manga
- Written by: Shotaro Ishimori
- Published by: Shogakukan
- Magazine: Weekly Shōnen Sunday (1966–1968); Big Comic (April 1968–April 1972)
- Original run: 1966 – April 10, 1972
- Volumes: 17
- Anime television series
- Directed by: Rintaro; Shinichi Suzuki
- Produced by: Ishimori Productions
- Written by: Ikuro Suzuki; Keiichi Abe; Masaki Tsuji
- Studio: Mushi Productions; Toei Animation; Studio Zero
- Original network: NET, MBS
- Original run: October 3, 1968 – September 24, 1969
- Episodes: 52
- Novel
- Written by: Shotaro Ishimori
- Published by: Asahi Sonorama
- Published: 1968
- Television drama
- Original network: Fuji TV
- Original run: 1981 – 1982
- Episodes: 4
- Live-action television film
- Directed by: Nozomu Amemiya
- Produced by: Yasushi Tsukamoto, Morinobu Shindō
- Written by: Toshio Terada
- Music by: Masashi Okuyama
- Studio: Tōei Uzumasa Eizō
- Released: December 19, 2015
- Runtime: 100 minutes

Sabu to Ichi Torimono Hikae (佐武と市捕物控; Sabu and Ichi's Detective Memoirs), sometimes translated as Sabu and Ichi's Detective Stories/Tales and Sabu and Ichi's Arrest Warrant, is a Japanese manga series by Shotaro Ishinomori originally published in Weekly Shōnen Sunday from 1966 to 1967. In April 1968, the series moved to serialization in the first issue of Big Comic, where it was published until the series ended four years later in the April 10, 1972 issue.

The manga was adapted into a black and white anime television series which aired on NET from October 3, 1968, to September 24, 1969. The series won the 1968 Shogakukan Manga Award.

In addition to the manga and anime series, a live action period drama series was aired on Fuji TV from 1981 to 1982 as part of their Jidaigeki Special series. A total of four specials were created and aired. Sabu and Ichi were played by veteran actors Tomokazu Miura and Tatsuo Umemiya (respectively), with Yūko Natori and Junzaburō Ban playing the parts of Midori and her father, Saheiji. In 2015, two live action film were released starring Teppei Koike, Kenichi Endō and Akemi Masuda.

== Plot ==
The series follows the adventures of Sabu, a young Edo bakufu investigator traveling with the blind master swordsman Ichi. In their travels, they assist the common people in solving mysteries and righting wrongs (usually committed by bandits or corrupt officials). Sabu is engaged to Midori, the daughter of his boss, who works as a police officer for the Tokugawa shogunate.

== Main characters ==
Sabu (佐武)
Voiced by: Kei Tomiyama (ep.1-33), Makio Inoue (ep. 34–52)
A handsome young warrior and apprentice thief-taker who works for Saheiji a police detective. His main weapon is a jitte attached to a long hemp rope, and he is an expert in using it to capture villains in order to turn them over to the authorities. He was originally an orphan from a poor village.
Ichi (市)
Voiced by: Teiji Ōmiya
A blind anma masseur who is also a master swordsman. He is a close friend of Sabu and frequently helps him capture criminals. His sword is similar to the one used by Zatoichi. All of the hair on his head (including eyebrows) is shaved, and his eyes are milky-white due to his blindness. He lost his sight due to being kicked in the face by a horse when he was very young, and he trained with the sword since that time.
Midori (みどり)
Voiced by: Reiko Mutō
Saheiji's daughter and Sabu's fiancé.
Saheiji (佐平次)
Voiced by: Kōichi Kitamura
A police detective, and Sabu's boss. He has a weak constitution, however, so spends a lot of time in bed. He generally only goes out in order to arrest those captured by Sabu.
Tanabe Yasunoshin (田辺 安之進)
Voiced by: Osamu Kobayashi
Sabu and Saheiji's boss. The equivalent of a chief of police for the Edo bakufu.
Santa (三太)
Voiced by: Minori Matsushima

== Media ==
=== Anime episode list ===
No.	Title	Original release date
1	"The Three Mad Dogs" "San Kichigai no Inu / Surī Maddo Doggusu" (三気違いの犬(スリーマッドドッグス))	October 3, 1968
During a fierce hurricane in Edo, three escaped prisoners, Katame, Mamushi and Yota, request shelter in a family's home. After eating and drinking their fill, they kill the father, rape the daughter, then kill her and her child. The next morning, Midori's father, chief Saheiji, wants Ichi to investigate the murders. They soon learn that three convicts escaped the night before. The convicts go to Hell's Island, a scoundrel's hamlet near the Ishikawa labour camp where they are well known. Katame bloodily reasserts his authority. They even kill Sabu's bounty hunter friend Senkichi who tracked them down alone. Ocho, daughter of the manager of Echigo-ya in the Kawara district delivers a letter sent to her father from Katame demanding reparations for his time in prison. They kidnap Ocho on her way back home, but then encounter Ichi who is almost beaten but Sabu arrives and saves him. Sabu blows his whistle, calling the officials to stop the convicts escaping to Hell's Island. That night the convicts shelter in a temple and threaten to kill Ocho if they are not allowed to leave. Ichi and Sabu enter the temple and release her, killing the three convicts.
2	"Rebel" "Hangyaku-sha" (反逆者)	October 10, 1968
At an early morning fish market in Edo, Matsu-no-Ichi displays his swordsmanship, and scares off a bullying rōnin. At the time of the Kanda festival, a poor family argues over the lack of money. Choji the husband goes out, encounters a stranger, and picks his pocket. Later, Sabu talks of rumours that thieves and pick pockets are being murdered. Altogether six pick pockets are murdered. While fishing Ichi encounters a young swordsman he saw at the market that morning, Hibiki Kyonosuke. His servant, Tendo, is killing all the thieves because he was robbed. At the Kanda festival Tendo attacks Choji but is challenged by Ichi who intervenes and mortally wounds him. In the wallet stolen by Choji is a plot by Hibiki to kill the Shogun and Council of Elders in revenge over the forced suicide of his father. Sabu and the officers go to arrest Hibiki who runs away. He encounters Ichi who is unwillingly forced to fight Hibiki and kills him.
3	"Wisdom" "Hannya" (般若)	October 17, 1968
It's autumn in Edo, and an innocent man, Hachigoro, is killed by a figure wearing a Hannya mask. Sabu wants to find the person, but after some practice at Yamaki Sensei's dojo where he is defeated by his daughter Oko, he realises that he may not have the necessary skills. Over the following nights the Hannya slasher strikes again. Sabu meets the figure in the night and recognises the Twin-Mind Blade Reverse style of Yamaki Sensei. They fight and Sabu is wounded, but the Hannya slasher runs off when Ichi appears. Sabu confronts Yamaki who swears to find the Hannya slasher. Makabe Junai, a suspect student from the dojo disappears, but is found dead and Sabu suspects Yamaki. Sabu goes to confront him, but finds him mercilessly beating his daughter Oko. She runs off, and the Hannya slasher enters. Ichi and the Hannya slasher fight, and it's revealed to be Oko. She has been tormented by her father and is lashing out at society. Ichi unwillingly fights back and kills her.
4	"Twilight in Edo" "Ōedo Boshoku" (大江戸暮色)	October 24, 1968
A fire breaks out where the samurai district adjoins the poorer district. The daimyō's Kites of Kaga from the samurai district and Team Ha from the community group of firemen fight over jurisdiction while the fire burns. Later, the Daimyo's number-one flag bearer, Genji, is killed in a laneway. Kokichi from Team Ha is the chief suspect. They had been competing over a Fukagawa geisha named Koinaga. Kokichi is arrested, but they suspect that he may have been framed. Koinaga tells them he spent the night with her. As Ichi escorts her home, they are attacked by samurai. He beats them off, wounding one on the arm and takes her back to his home. Sabu finds that a Kite of Kaga samurai, Iwamura Yajuro, has such an injury. The Kites of Kaga's ladder bearer, Kentaro, is later found dead, then over the next three days more samurai are killed. They go to Genji's house to search for clues and find it ransacked, but find promissory notes from the Daimyo's caretaker, Sawashima Geki. Ichi confronts Geki for embezzling his master's funds. Geki calls in his samurai, but Ichi beats them and Geki is arrested and punished. Later Koinaga marries Kokichi and Ichi reveals that he had developed an affection for her too.
5	"Pursue the Pick-Pocketing Woman" "Onna Suri o Oe" (女スリを追え)	October 31, 1968
A young beautiful woman is accused of pick-pocketing and strips to prove her innocence. Her rough companion then beats up the accusing merchant. Sabu is sent to find the pick-pocket. He finds and arrests her, realising that she's Okyo, who duped him out of some money when they were children. Because of her good behaviour in jail, she is releases early, and returns to her gang, but she is no longer trusted because of her friendship with Sabu. She tells Midori about the location of the gang their leader Rokuzo because she believes that they will kill Sabu. She is overheard by Rokuzo's men and kidnapped, but Sabu goes to her rescue, and is backed up by Ichi. Eventually Rokuzo and his gang are arrested, and Okyo decides to leave her life of crime behind.
6	"The Lullaby of Death" "Shi o Yobu Komoriuta" (死を呼ぶ子守唄)	November 7, 1968
Ichi saves a small boy from drowning after he was knocked into a river by palanquin bearers. The boy reacts strongly when he sees Sabu's jitte as his father, Kisoya Genzo from Fukagawa was falsely accused of murder and arrested. Ichi returns the boy to his stepmother who thought he was dead. She said that she was praying for him, but Ichi is suspicious. The boy's uncle plans another attempt on the boy's life with the stepmother because the boy, Tarokichi, is the heir to the family store. Meanwhile, at Kisoya, Tarokichi is about to be exorcised by fire by his stepmother and uncle, but is saved by Ichi. Sabu suspects that the palanquin bearers were involved in the death of their client and goes to investigate and finds the culprit, clearing Kisoya Genzo. As Ichi as minding Tarokichi, the uncle and his men attack him, but Ichi manages to defeat them and kill the uncle. When Ichi is about to kill the stepmother, Tarokichi pleads for her life and Ichi sheathes his sword.
7	"The Backhand Slash of Tears" "Namida no Gyakute Kiri" (涙の逆手斬り)	November 14, 1968
Six doctors who studied Dutch medicine in Nagasaki are killed. Only one is still alive. Sabu visits the palace physician, Yokoi Koan who explains that the remaining doctor Kitaoka Gennojo, is a drunkard and swordsman. Ichi visits Kitaoka who appears to be a caring doctor and says that he can restore Ichi's sight, even if he cannot pay. Ichi is apprehensive but the surgery takes place in the rooms of Yokoi Koan at the palace, including using the Shogun's ice. The delicate operation takes place and Ichi must recover in total darkness, meanwhile Sabu guards Kitaoka. Four men attack Sabu and threaten the doctor. Kitaoka kills one, but is shot and wounded. Sabu tracks them to the Ryuzawa Temple and sees them being paid by Iori, Yokoi Koan's assistant. At the palace, Sabu finds Iori poisoned by Yokoi Koan, who ordered the killings because he felt threatened by the success of the other doctors. Yokoi's men attack Sabu and Ichi comes to his aid. Ichi is hindered by his partial vision so he removes the bandages. This means that he will stay blind, but can slay Yokoi's swordsmen and save his dear friend Sabu.
8	"The Evil Winning Ticket" "Ma no Atari Kuji" (魔の当りくじ)	November 21, 1968
There is a One Thousand-Ryo Fortune lottery to restore the Minatagawa Shrine, run by Komada Shuzen a retainer of Lord Mito's clan. Ichi buys a ticket as a donation, and two poor men behind him purchase the last ticket. Many people gather to watch the public draw, and the two men win. They give their ticket to the ticket-seller for safekeeping, but both men are killed during the night. Sabu investigates and finds the ticket-seller has also been killed. Meanwhile, Ichi also realises that the link between the three murders is the winning ticket and goes to collect the one thousand ryo with the orphaned boy of one of the winners. He meets Komada Shuzen who reveals that he knows about the unpublicised third death. Realising his plot has been exposed, Komada orders his men to attack Ichi, but Ichi kills the swordsmen and then Komada himself. Orphans themselves, Ichi and Sabu hope to set the boy on the path to a better life.
9	"Exile of Terror" "Kyōfu no Shima Okuri" (恐怖の島送り)	November 28, 1968
Sabu captures the criminal Tsunegoro, known as Sadosune accused of rousing the labourers of Sado gold mine under the Shoganate and plotting a rebellion. He is to be exiled in Sado. Sabu is assigned to the escort mission to take him there, along the Tokai highway. It is a 14-day round trip and winter is setting in. A decoy palanquin is sent on ahead, but it is ambushed and the officials killed. Sabu's palanquin frightened bearers run off, so he and Sadosune continue through the snow. Meanwhile, Ichi has a premonition and sets off after Sabu. Sadosune becomes ill, and Sabu looks after him, much to his surprise. When Sadosune recovers, they leave their shelter, but Sadosune's men surround them. Just then, Ichi arrives and kills all of them. That night the three of them shelter in a cabin. Although Sadosune has a chance to escape, he does not because of the kindness shown by Sabu. At the end of the journey, Sadosune and Sabu acknowledge the bond formed during their trials together.
10	"The Law of Hell" "Jigoku no Okite" (地獄の掟)	December 5, 1968
Edo was plagued by a mysterious thief who would steal from the storehouses of the greedy Daimyo and distribute the money to the poor. The people called him Lightning Boy. Sabu is out to catch him, but Ichi, is less enthusiastic after encountering him during the night. Meanwhile, at the Tanba clan mansion the caretaker and storage manager have been embezzling large amounts of money and decide to blame Lightning Boy for the theft. They also decide to scapegoat the chief officer Shonosuke. When the storehouse is found to be empty, the honourable Shonosuke commits Seppuku, and Lightning Boy is blamed for the tragedy. To clear his name, Shinkichi the Lightning Boy eavesdrops on the two embezzlers at the Tanba clan mansion, but is detected and badly wounded. Before he dies, he manages to tell Ichi and Sabu they plan to move the gold that night. Ichi and Sabu intercept them, and in the ensuing fight the criminals are all killed. The next day, the 10,000 ryo are returned to the Tanba clan with a note from Lightning Boy.
11	"The Law of Hell" "Jigoku no okite" (地獄の掟)	December 12, 1968
Edo is plagued by a mysterious thief who steals from the storehouses of the greedy Daimyo and distributee the money to the poor. The people call him Lightning Boy. Sabu is out to catch him, but Ichi, is less enthusiastic after encountering him during the night. Meanwhile, at the Tanba clan mansion the caretaker and storage manager have been embezzling large amounts of money and decide to blame Lightning Boy for the theft. They also decide to scapegoat the chief officer Shonosuke. When the storehouse is found to be empty, the honourable Shonosuke commits Seppuku, and Lightning Boy is blamed for the tragedy. To clear his name, Shinkichi the Lightning Boy eavesdrops on the two embezzlers at the Tanba clan mansion, but is detected and badly wounded. Before he dies, he manages to tell Ichi and Sabu they plan to move the gold that night. Ichi and Sabu intercept them, and in the ensuing fight the criminals are all killed. The next day, the 10,000 ryo are returned to the Tanba clan with a note from Lightning Boy.
12	"The Spiteful Tempo Coin" "Urami no tenpōsen" (うらみの天保銭)	December 19, 1968
Ichi is beaten up by other masseurs who believe that he is practicing in their area. He goes home and starts drinking, cursing the power of money. Sabu us called to attend the funeral of Sota the tile maker who apparently died accidentally by falling from a roof. Sabu is suspicious and believes that Sota was killed by a projectile. Then came a string of highway robberies, with people killed by a small sharp weapon. Sabu sespects it may be a mat sewing needle and questions mat-maker Gisuke and finds he was a former samurai. Sabu follows him, and sees him kill a rabid dog by throwing a needle. Sabu gives chase and confronts him. Gisuke tells Sabu that he committed the crimes to pay for his Geisha daughter Tsuru's freedom, and agrees to give himself up the next day. Sabu tells the magistrate who immediately takes officers to arrest Gisuke. Gisuke feels betrayed and fights back, killing several officers with his needles until he is finally arrested. His daughter is mortified to see him treated this way, and Sabu heart was heavy at the outcome. After his heavy drinking session Ichi says the real culprit is still out there - poverty
13	"The Black Temple" "Kuroi Tera" (黒い寺)	December 26, 1968
The corpse of a young woman surfaces in the river, and Sabu and Ichi deduces that she was murdered. That night a ronin steals her body from the guardhouse. Sabu goes in pursuit but is stopped near the Shogun's Mt Hokyo Enko Temple at Nichidoin by a group of samurai. Dressed as a beggar, Sabu goes to investigate the temple which beyond the magistrate's jurisdiction, but without success. He tries to identify the woman, but just gets blisters on his feet from walking the streets. Then, a couple arrive and claim she was their beautiful daughter Nami who was taken into the inner palace as a servant under Lady Miyo. While visiting them on leave, she was taken back to the temple at Nichidoin, the quarters of Lady Miyo. Sabu goes to Nichidoin, temple and finds Nami's body buried in the snow. He then overhears the ronin talk about how Lady Miyo saw Nami's beauty as a threat and she was killed. Sabu is seen and attacked by the ronin's men, but gets assistance from Ichi who followed him. In the ensuing fight, the ronin and all his men are killed.
14	"Jamaikuru, Hound of the Wilderness" "Kōya no maken shamaikuru" (荒野の魔犬シャマイクル)	January 2, 1969
On New Year's Eve, Ichi tells Sabu a story from his past. He was heading through the show to the village Oshamanbe in Enzo when he was surrounded by hungry wolves. He killed many, but they only stopped when a large white hound appeared - the blind Ainu dog Jamaikuru. Ichi reached a cabin where hunters were after the 500 ryo reward for his head. The hound appeared, attacked the men who wanted to kill him and ran off. Ichi also wanted the reward to restore his sight. He met an old man who told the story of the village of Pauchikara that was wiped out by the samurai of Matsumae. The villagers carved a map of the village treasure on Jamaikuru's forehead which is why Matsumae has offered the reward. The old man asks Ichi to kill Jamaikuru and end its sad life of being hunted. Ichi goes out to talk to the hound but Jamaikuru attacks him and he kills it. The act left him incredibly sad, even though Ichi realised that's what Jamaikuru wanted.
15	"A Prison in Edo" "Ōedo bangaichi" (大江戸番外地)	January 9, 1969
Sabu is accused of beating a noodle vendor in Yagenbori and stealing his money. He is taken to prison and is beaten by the inmates. A man, Matsukichi is also thrown in after being beaten and tortured. He was a member of a gang the stole a thousand ryo, but will not divulge the names of his accomplices. Sabu invites Matsukichi to escape with him. They manage to escape, and Matsukichi reveals that the ronin who used him will kill his mother and sister if he talks. Ichi checks on Matsukichi's family, and when Matsukichi is told that they are living in misery he gives Ichi the name of the samurai, Kasai. Sabu and Ichi catch up with Kasai and his gang as they are about to leave by boat. A fight ensues, but Ichi resists killing Kasai so that he can experience hell in prison.
16	"The Merciless Arrest" "捕物無情" (Torimono mujō)	January 16, 1969
On a stormy night, two ninjas steal an important document from Ohama Palace in Edo. Ichi foils their escape they and take a family in the lighthouse hostage. The Shogun's men arrive and surround the lighthose. The document they stole is an investigation which shows proposed money distribution to the fiefdoms. The effect will be to abolish the lords and expand the Shogun's own power After a 3-day siege during which the leader show kindness to the lighthouse family, the ninjas try to escape but fail. The ninjas signal for reinforcements, and the next day a boat approached the lighthouse. With the officials distracted by the approaching boat, they try again to escape, but again meet Sabu and Ichi. Sabu catches one, but Ichi has a tough fight with the leader. Ichi eventually prevails, and with his dying breath, the ninja leader tells Ichi of the dangerous contents of the document. Ichi then destroys the document, preventing the Shogun from acting on its contents. Sabu and Ichi lay their souls to rest.
17	"Night of the Autumn Drizzle" "Shigure furu yoru" (しぐれ降る夜)	January 23, 1969
The Chief's assistant Yanokichi reminds Kayo, a woman who owns an inn, that she has an old debt to pay. Yanokichi has a young samurai with him, but he seems disinterested in following Yanokichi's instructions. The samurai meets Ichi on the way out and senses that he is a good swordsman. Kayo came from a poor family and went to Edo to work as a servant. She accidentally splashed water on passing Chief Kanroshi Daigoro and was dismissed. Starving, she took a persimmon from a tree but Daigoro saw it and blackmailed her. Tomo, a vagrant Kayo employed and who secretly loves her, goes out and kills Daigoro. On his return, they declare their love for each other and leave. Sabu catches up with them, but so does Daigoro's assistant Yanokichi who wants vigilante justice. A fight ensues because Sabu defends Tomo, then Ichi arrives to help. The samurai, sick with consumption and idle to this moment, challenges Ichi but loses and is killed. As a vagrant, Tomo has few rights and would be thrown in jail, but Ichi suggests if he is married to Kayo he will be free – a solution that suits both the couple and Sabu.
18	"The Tearful Hackberry of Separation" "Namida no enkirienoki" (なみだの縁切り榎)	January 30, 1969
At Itabashi Station on the Nakasen Highway a woman drives a nail into a straw figure, but is killed by a paid assassin. She has scars on her feet. Ichi massages a woman who has similar scars, from the chains of the brothel owner Daikokuro Kanzo in Itabashi. At Daikokuro the women are treated badly. Sataro, the man who killed the woman at Itabashi Station, lies sick at Daikokuro but the owner wants him gone. Shino, one of the women, looks after him and they talk about their lives. Daikokuro reveals that Sataro killed her gambler husband Yoshizo, however she cannot bring herself to hate Sataro. Daikokuro tells Sataro that her son is on Tsukuda Island. Sabu and Ichi pay a visit to Daikokuro to gather information. Sataro tries to by Shino's freedom but Daikokuro refuses, they fight but Sabu and Ichi intervene, and Ichi kills the treacherous Daikokuro. Sabu reluctantly arrests the reformed Sataro who reunited Shino with her son.
19	"The Babysitting Gangster" "Komori Yakuza"子守やくざ	February 6, 1969
On the second day of the new year, a child is run over by a palanquin which does not stop and an unknown man nurses her. Ichi takes her to doctor Jun'an while Sabu hunts the palanquin's client. Days later her parents appear and say their daughter Chii was abducted and a ransom demanded. However, Chii says the man, Sanji befriended her, not realizing that he was one of the kidnappers band. The bandit boss takes his men to the doctor's house to retrieve Chii, but Sanji tries to stop him and is speared in the back. A fight ensues and Ichi kills the boss while the kind Sanji goes on to recover from his wound.
20	"The Grudge" "Urami"うらみ	January 30, 1969
Sanji hires four swordsmen to kill Ichi, but Ichi leaves them lying wounded in the street, including one whom he blinded. Sanji then engages a ronin to do the job. Ichi develops a fever and recalls the time when he was blinded after being struck by the hoof of a samurai's horse, but also regrets the number of people he has slain. He ventures out the next day with a bamboo cane instead of his sword, but Sanji attacks him and Ichi only just escapes. Sanji believes that Ichi killed the woman's father who took him in and raised him, but she knows her father was killed because of his shady dealings. Sanji lays a trap for Ichi with the ronin while the woman contacts Sabu who takes Ichi's sword to him. Ichi manages to slay the ronin, not realizing that he was the one whose horse blinded him.
21	"Trap of the Devil's Lair" "Makutsu no wana"魔窟の罠	January 30, 1969
A man is found hanged on a tree, but Sabu deduces that he was killed first than strung up. He also has the distinct odor of opium and the only clue is a talisman from the Prayer Bridge. Lord Tanabe identifies him as one of his men working undercover and charges Sabu with finding the culprit. After waiting for nights near the bridge, Sabu and Ichi see a group of men wearing Tengu masks delivering opium. Sabu breaks one mask, exposing the wearer, so the group attempts to assassinate him at Chief Saheiji's house. Sabu goes into hiding, but they capture Ichi after threatening Midori. Midori recognizes the man Sabu saw as Akiba, a teacher at the temple school, and Sabu tracks him to Hell's Mansion owned by Echizenya. Sabu finds Ichi being tortured, and rescues him, then they fight the band of drug smugglers, aided by Akiba who had been duped into joining them. Akiba leads them to an underground opium den, where Ichi finally kills Echizenya in a sword fight.
22	"The Beautiful Prey" "Utsukushī emono"美しい獲物-	January 30, 1969
Ichi visits the Akashiya household to give a massage, but the belligerent master of the house arrives and throws him out. later, the daughter of Akashiya pays Ichi for the massage on her way to the Ota Dojo of the Shinkage style to practice Kendo. That night, Jinbei Akashiya is fatally wounded in his home by a sword and he appears to name Ura and Mon, his wife and daughter as the culprits. Apparently Jinbei killed Mon's father and then married the wealthy widow Ura. When the retainer Tanjiro arranges for Mon to be arrested, the sales clerk, Chushichi, confesses that he's the murderer to protect Mon. However Sabu's investigation proves that Tanjiro's real name is Mon-ji and he was not away in Kanagawa as he claims on the night of the murder, and he is the real killer. Ichi says that Mon will now be safe in Chushichi's arms.
23	"The Lullaby That Killed Him" "Aitsu o koroshita komori-uta"あいつを殺した子守唄	March 6, 1969
Sabu and Ichi learn that a thief plans to break into the Omiya storehouse so they lie in wait. The thief uses poison darts from a blow pipe and almost kills Sabu who is saved by Ichi. After a long chase, Sabu eventually catches the great thief Rokurota, which enhances Sabu's reputation> However, even threatened with the death penalty, Rokurota refuses to name his accomplices. A woman, Aki, visits Rokurota at the Kitamachi Magistrate's Office, and Sabu follows her to a temple. She says Rokurota's life is in danger, so Sabu places Ichi in Rokurota's cell to protect him. However, Rokurota's brother Gorota shoots him with a poison dart and sets the Magistrate's Office on fire. Rokurota's body is not found, but later he attacks Gorota who kills him. Sabu and Ichi pursue and Gorota who falls and impales himself on a bamboo stake. Later, Aki sadly eaves Omiya, taking the ashes of the two brothers with her.
24	"Curse of the Red Cat" "Noroi no aka neko"呪いの赤猫	March 13, 1969
The wealthy merchant Nishijinya receives a demand from the Red Cat for half of his wealth. His daughter Sono reports it to Chief Saheiji but Nishijinya is tight-lipped about the incident until Sono is kidnapped. Nishijinya reveals that 20 years ago he was a smuggler with two men called Koshuya and Red Cat in Nagasaki. After becoming successful but risked being caught, they decided to split the money, but Red Cat was poisoned, leaving only Nishijinya and Koshuya. Later, Koshuya is apparently attacked and wounded, then Sabu and Ichi are also attacked by a group of men. They capture the leader, but he is killed by an arrow before he can say who hired him. Meanwhile, Koshuya, pretending to be the Red Cat lures Nishijinya into a trap to retrieve Sono and he is also captured. However, Sabu and Ichi kill Koshuya and his henchmen, releasing Nishijinya and Sono.
25	"The Cherry Blossom Blizzard of Tears" "Namida no sakura fubuki"涙の桜吹雪	March 2, 1969
It is spring and the townspeople are entertained by a swordsman skilfully slicing paper into small pieces. While Sabu and Ichi are out drinking, there is a burglary at the Nagasakiya store and the family and employees are all killed. Unfortunately, Sabu arrives late smelling of alcohol. The perpetrator is Gennai, the Will-o-the-Wisp. Meanwhile, the swordsman, Danbei Todoroki, moves in next door and Ichi recognizes his wife Maki as the woman he loved years ago. She was the daughter of a samurai and he was a humble blind masseur, but they still have affection for each other. Later, Sabu and Ichi overhear Todoroki and Maki arguing over a robbery he is planning and suspect that he is really Gennai, and the robbery will be at Yaozen in Nihonbashi where Maki is currently employed. Ichi is conflicted, not knowing whether to help Sabu or protect Maki, so he prevents Todoroki from entering the Yaozen building. Todoroki's men are captured but he escapes and is confronted by Ichi. During the duel, Ichi kills Todoroki, however Maki is fatally wounded and dies in Ichi's arms.
26	"The Blood-Spurting Highway" "Chikemuriri kaidō"血煙り街道	March 27, 1969
A group of five samurai are set upon by Aoe and his men, but one manages to reach the chief's house. He gives Ichi a package for the head page Morishita, of lord of Kanuma fiefdom in Shimotsuke which is a joint covenant between Edo and Kanuma. Ichi decides to go alone to deliver the package and he is ambushed by Aoe and his men, but manages to escape. However, he is ambushed again along the highway, and this time Ichi is forced to draw his sword, killing many of the swordsmen, but Aoe escapes. That night he Ichi is attacked again, but this time he kills Aoe. The traitorous retainer at Kanuma hears of Aoe's death, and takes his men to stop Ichi. However, with the help of Sabu who followed him, Ichi disposes of the traitors and peace returns to Kanuma.
27	"The Bodyguard from Hell" "Jigoku no yōjinbō"地獄の用心棒	April 2, 1969
On a March night, the magistrate launches a search for contraband guns. After seeing a suspect cargo, Sabu questions the trader Bishuya who says it was a shipment of kettles. Bishuya then sends three ronin after Sabu, but Ichi arrives and defeats them without drawing his sword. Bishuya then sends his bodyguard, a ronin master swordsman to kill Ichi, but after an initial skirmish they are interrupted and agree to face each other again that night. They meet on a bridge and Ichi defeats the bodyguard, but lets him go. Later, Sabu inspects a Bishuya cargo and finds guns, but the smugglers who are led by the bodyguard capture him and hold him hostage. Ichi goes to Sabu's rescue and he again encounters the bodyguard. This time, Ichi fights for his life on the shoreline, but finally manages to kill the bodyguard.
28	"Tracking the Murderer" "Koroshi no tsuiseki"殺しの追跡	April 9, 1969
The Sakaiya household is robbed by five ronin and its inhabitants are slaughtered before it is burned to the ground. Sabu angrily complains to Ichi about the senseless slaughter. Sabu finds a prescription at the scene and finds it was written for a sickly young woman who probably could not afford the medicine. Coincidentally he meets a young woman, Fumi, taking expensive medicine paid for by her ronin brother. Sabu and Ichi again encounter Fumi along the road to visit her brother some distance away, but this time she being attacked by a group of rough men. Sabu and Ichi rescue her and help her on her way, but she is too ill to continue and she asks Sabu to take a package to her brother, Tanaka. Sabu agrees even though he suspects Tanaka is a murderer. He delivers the package but accuses the brother of being involved in the Sakaiya robbery and murder. Sabu and Ichi are then attacked by the other four ronin, but chase them by boat onto churning waters and capture Tanaka. However, Tanaka must pay for his crime, and Ichi tells Fumi that her brother has already left, but that he will write to her and wished her happiness.
