= Gringo (manga) =

Japanese manga series

グリンゴ (Guringo)
- Manga
- Written by: Osamu Tezuka
- Published by: Shogakukan
- Magazine: Big Comic
- Original run: August 10, 1987 – January 25, 1989
- Volumes: 3

Gringo (Japanese: グリンゴ, Hepburn: Guringo) is a manga series by Osamu Tezuka that began serialization in 1987 in the Shogakukan manga magazine Big Comic.

== Plot ==
In 1982, the Edo Shoji Corporation is a large Japanese trading company that has created a new branch in the fictional country of Cannibalia. Executive director Yabushita assigns Hitoshi Himoto to be the head of the new South American office, which is an exceptional promotion for Hitoshi. Having joined the workforce after his days of being a sumo wrestler, Hitoshi finds himself rapidly climbing the corporate ladder.

Not long after he is assigned to South America, director Yabushita suddenly resigns from the company. Apparently he was involved in a scandalous affair with a woman and forced to leave after news of the affair had leaked. This severely affects Hitoshi as he is then demoted and transferred to a different location in South America.

Hitoshi finds himself assigned to the city of Esecarta in the Republic of Santalna, a South American country that is in a state of political turmoil. Each day, the government soldiers fight with a rebel group of guerrillas in the streets. While reading some information at the Japanese embassy, Hitoshi learns of a certain metal that is indispensable to the manufacturing of electronics. This rare metal is mined at Mt. Montetombo in the Fego Province of South America, but the mountain serves as the stronghold for the rebel guerrillas, led by the fearsome José García.

Hitoshi attempts to make a name for himself in a dangerous land, working together with the people that know him as the "Gringo". Political and corporate intrigue and drama are all around in Tezuka's last manga.

== Characters ==
- Hitoshi Himoto is an ex-sumo wrestler who now works for a major Japanese trading company Edo Shoji. He is assigned to a new post as the head of the company's new branch office in the city of Cannibalia, Republic of Rido, South America, then transferred to Esecarta.
- Elen
- Rune
- Kazu Onigasoto
- Miho Togakushi
- José García is a leader of the group of guerillas that is fighting a war with the government in Esecarta, Republic of Santalna. His group controls the territory around the Fego Province which contains Mt. Montetombo.
- Kondo
- Kumagai
- Pepe
- Ambassador Kageyama is a Japanese ambassador stationed in the Japanese Embassy within the Republic of Santalna.
- Tomonaga
- Toto

== Unfinished work ==
Osamu Tezuka died on February 9, 1989, leaving Gringo as one of his few unfinished works. It was still in serialization only a couple of weeks before his death. The page for Gringo at TezukaOsamu@World claims that the protagonist was based on Nobuyuki Wakaoji, a Japanese businessman who was kidnapped in the Philippines in 1986 and released after four months of captivity. This event was a major piece of shocking news that shook Japan. Coincidentally, the day Tezuka died was also the day Nobuyuki Wakaoji died.

== Other manga ==
In the Osamu Tezuka Manga Complete Works release of Gringo, one of Tezuka's short stories, "New Ryosaishii Koukenidan", was added at the end of Volume 3.

== See also ==
- List of Osamu Tezuka manga
- Osamu Tezuka
- Osamu Tezuka's Star System
