= Shūichi Higurashi =

Japanese manga artist

- Born: 日暮 修一 (Higurashi Shūichi); 1936 Matsudo, Chiba Prefecture, Japan
- Died: April 13, 2012 (aged 75–76) Tokyo, Japan
- Area: Manga Artist
- Notable works: Cover artist of Big Comic
- Spouse: Kazuko Higurashi (日暮妻和子)

Shūichi Higurashi (日暮修一) (1936 – April 13, 2012) was a Japanese manga illustrator and magazine artist. Higurashi was the cover artist for Big Comic, a Japanese manga magazine, for more than forty years, from 1970 until fall 2011.

Higurashi was raised in Matsudo, Chiba Prefecture. He studied at Musashino Art School, now known as Musashino Art University, a progressive university with a curriculum in fine arts and industrial design. He became head of character illustration at Big Comic in 1970. Each issue of Big Comic during this era featured a large caricature of a famous individual on the cover, typically sports stars, actors and, politicians. All were drawn by Higurashi in his signature style of a large head relative to a small body. His drawings became a trademark of the magazine.

Higurashi was well known for his work outside of Big Comic. He and his younger brother, the Mainichi Shinbun copywriter Higurashi Shinzō (b. 1944), wrote and illustrated the long-running series Shūichi, Shinzō no mōningu jakku for the Sunday edition of the newspaper. The series ran from 1981 until 2006. In addition to his illustrations, Higurashi also illustrated for the defunct magazine Rapita, and worked as a business advertisement designer.

To mark his 25th anniversary as the cover artist with Big Comic, the Shogakukan publisher released a book of his cover illustrations in 1994 titled "Big na Kao". In 2000, Higurashi received a special Shogakukan Manga Award for his lifetime achievement as a manga illustrator. In 2006 Higurashi was the feature of an exhibition of his works at the Matsudo Cultural Hall. Higurashi stepped down as cover illustrator of Big Comic in fall 2011 due to declining health. He died in Tokyo from pneumonia on April 13, 2012, at the age of 75. Higurashi was survived by his wife, Kazuko.

== Selected works ==
- Yoshimori, Shigeo; Higurashi, Shūichi (2006), 菜の花と雷さま (Nanohana to kaminarisama) (in Japanese), Tokyo: BOC Shuppanbu, OCLC 673676643
- Higurashi, Shūichi (1994), ビッグな顔: 「ビッグコミック」の表紙で綴る25年 (Biggu na kao: "Bikku komikku" no hyōshi de tsuzuru 25-nen) (in Japanese) (Dai 1 han ed.), Tokyo: Shōgakkan, ISBN 9784096807118, OCLC 63759551
- Higurashi, Shūichi (2006), ヒグラシ・ワンダーワールド： 日暮修一の世界 (Higurashi wandā wārudo: Higurashi Shūichi no sekai) [exhibition catalogue] (in Japanese), Matsudo, Chiba: Matsudoshi Kyōiku Iinkai, OCLC 676259789
- Higurashi, Shūichi (2006), ヒグラシ・ワンダーワールド： 日暮修一の世界 (Higurashi wandā wārudo: Higurashi Shūichi no sekai) (in Japanese), Tokyo: Tōkyō Bijutsu, ISBN 9784808708061, OCLC 169947779
