= Big Comic =

Japanese manga magazine

- Cover of the April 25, 2008 issue, featuring actor Hiroshi Tachi
- Editor-in-Chief: Masaichirō Kurashina
- Categories: Seinen manga
- Frequency: Semimonthly on the 10th and 25th
- Circulation: 103,667; (July–September 2026)
- First issue: 18 February 1968
- Company: Shogakukan
- Country: Japan
- Language: Japanese
- Website: bigcomicbros.net/bigcomic/

Big Comic (Japanese: ビッグコミック, Hepburn: Biggu Komikku) is a semimonthly seinen manga magazine published since 18 February 1968 by Shogakukan in Japan.

== Publication history ==
It was originally launched as a monthly magazine, but switched to twice monthly on the 10th and 25th beginning in April 1968. It is paired with sister magazine Big Comic Original, going on sale in the weeks Big Comic Original does not. Circulation in 2008 was reported at slightly over a half-million copies. but by mid-2015 had declined to 315,000, as part of an industry-wide trend in manga magazine sales.

The magazine has published works by a number of well-known manga artists, including Osamu Tezuka, Shotaro Ishinomori, Sanpei Shirato, Takao Saito, Fujiko Fujio A, Fujiko F. Fujio, and Tetsuya Chiba. Big Comic also serializes Saito's Golgo 13, which is the oldest manga series still in publication.

The front cover of the magazine featured a caricature of a famous individual by manga illustrator Shūichi Higurashi for more than forty years. Higurashi's drawings were featured on the cover of Big Comic from 1970 until 2011. Higurashi retired in the autumn of 2011 due to failing health.

== Legacy ==
Big Comic played a pivotal role in the maturation of postwar manga, particularly in the emergence of seinen manga during the late 1960s and 1970s. The magazine brought together diverse artistic currents: it featured contributors from the gekiga tradition, such as Sanpei Shirato and Shigeru Mizuki, as well as artists associated with story manga, including Osamu Tezuka and the Fujiko team. Under the editorial direction of Konishi Yōnosuke, Big Comic embraced the concept of the "quasi-novel" (chūkan shōsetsu), aiming to bridge mass media and serious literature. This editorial vision helped elevate manga as a serious art form and positioned Big Comic as a cornerstone of literary and artistic manga. While some critics of the time resisted what they saw as the commercialization of manga by major publishers, Big Comic nonetheless became a platform for more mature, diverse, and experimental storytelling, influencing generations of artists and readers.

== List of works ==
=== Currently serialized ===
These series appear according to a regular schedule in the magazine.

- Golgo 13 (ゴルゴ13) by Takao Saito
- Hinemosu no Tari Nikki (ひねもすのたり日記) by Tetsuya Chiba (since 2015)
- Deep3 written by Mitsuhiro Mizuno and illustrated by Ryosuke Tobimatsu
- Ōgon no Rafu: Sōta no Stance (黄金のラフ〜草太のスタンス〜) by Tsuyoshi Nakaima
- S - Saigo no Keikan (S エス‐最後の警官‐) by Yoichi Komori and Yutaka Toudo
- Shin C-Kyu Salaryman Koza (新C級さらりーまん講座) by Keisuke Yamashina
- Sōmubu Sōmuka Yamaguchi Roppeita (総務部総務課山口六平太), written by Norio Hayashi and illustrated by Ken'ichirō Takai
- Sekuhara-kachō no Tsubuyaki (五月原課長のつぶやき) by Tōru Nakajima
- Gallery Fake (ギャラリーフェイク) by Fujihiko Hosono (continued from Big Comic Spirits)

=== Irregularly serialized ===
These series are currently serialized, but have no specific schedule for when each chapter appears in the magazine.

- Uchū Kazoku Nobeyama by Jirō Okazaki

=== Formerly serialized ===
- A Distant Neighborhood by Jiro Taniguchi
- Akabee by Hiroshi Kurogane
- Ayako by Osamu Tezuka
- Barbara by Osamu Tezuka
- Big Wing, written by Masao Yajima and illustrated by Shinji Hikino
- Baiyaku Kakebachō Kazuryū by Shotaro Ishinomori
- C-kyū Salaryman Kōza by Keisuke Yamashina
- Chūshun Komawari-kun by Tatsuhiko Yamagami
- Cruise: Ishi Yamada Kōhei Kōkaishi, written by Masao Yajima and illustrated by Hiroyuki Kikuta
- Double Face by Fujihiko Hosono
- Eagle: The Making of an Asian-American President by Kaiji Kawaguchi
- Five by Riki Kusaka, created by Yuzuru Hirayama
- Gekiga ObaQ by Fujiko F. Fujio
- Gekitō Magnitude 7.7 by Takao Yamaguchi
- Gin no Shippo by Shinri Mori
- Gringo by Osamu Tezuka
- Hana China written by Yūji Nishi and illustrated by Shinji Hikino
- Happyaku Yachō Hyōri no Kewaishi by Shotaro Ishinomori
- Hidamari no Ki by Osamu Tezuka
- Hotel by Shotaro Ishinomori
- I.L. by Osamu Tezuka
- The Laughing Salesman (one-shot) by Fujiko A. Fujio
- Kamui Den: Dai-ni-bu, written by Sanpei Shirato and illustrated by Tetsuji Okamoto (1988–2000)
- Kamui Gaiden: Dai-ni-bu by Sanpei Shirato (1982–1987)
- Kamurobamura-e by Mikio Igarashi
- Kobayakawa Nobuki no Koi by Fumi Saimon
- Kusakabe Shomei Kyūka Omiya-san by Shotaro Ishinomori
- Minotaurus no Sara by Fujiko F. Fujio
- Mirai no Omoide by Fujiko F. Fujio
- Munakata Kyōju Ikōroku by Yukinobu Hoshino
- MW by Osamu Tezuka
- Nakaharu Koko-kun by Tatsuhiko Yamagami
- Notari Matsutarō by Tetsuya Chiba
- Ode to Kirihito by Osamu Tezuka
- Osozaki Jijii by Yoshinori Kobayashi
- The Quest for the Missing Girl by Jiro Taniguchi
- Roommates by Yōko Kondō (1991–1996)
- Sabu to Ichi Torimono Hikae by Shotaro Ishinomori
- Shō mo Nai Bokura no Renai-ron by Hidenori Hara
- Sora! Flight Attendant Monogatari, written by Masao Yajima and illustrated by Shinji Hikino
- Swallowing the Earth by Osamu Tezuka
- Taiyō no Mokushiroku by Kaiji Kawaguchi
- Tono Monogatari by Shigeru Mizuki (2008–2009)
- Tsukiji Uogashi Sandaime, written by Masaharu Nabeshima and illustrated by Mitsuo Hashimoto
- Veterinarian Dolittle, written by Midori Natsu and illustrated by Kiyoshi Chikuyama
- Watashi no Hibi by Shigeru Mizuki (2014–2015)
