= Mighty Morphin Power Rangers World Tour Live on Stage =

1994–96 stage show tour

- Tour by Mighty Morphin Power Rangers
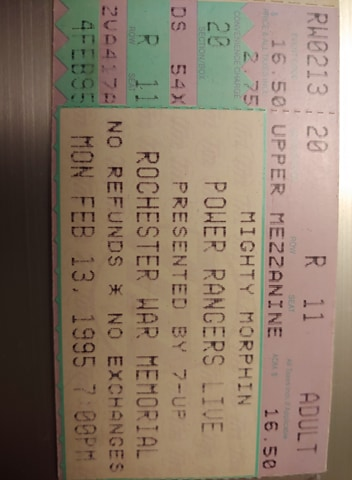

Mighty Morphin Power Rangers World Tour Live on Stage (also known as Mighty Morphin Power Rangers Live) was a live stage show featuring the second season team of the Mighty Morphin Power Rangers (Tommy Oliver as the White Ranger, Rocky DeSantos, Adam Park, Aisha Campbell, Billy Cranston, and Kimberly Hart). It tells how the Power Rangers defeat Lord Zedd's plans to take over the Earth while trying to defeat Lumitor, The Fire Lion. Unlike the Sentai stage shows that feature the actual actors from the series, this show incorporates stage actors in the Power Ranger suits playing out with pre-recorded audio. None of the actual actors are seen on stage aside from video footage played on a screen. A recording of the performance from the Universal Amphitheatre in Los Angeles was released as a direct to video exclusive, and this was then included as an extra in the German DVD boxset of the complete second season of MMPR. It was also later included as an extra on one of the two bonus discs that came exclusively with the MMPR Complete Series boxset released in the United States and Canada. The show was sponsored by 7 Up. Cities where performances took place include Detroit, San Jose, California, San Diego, California, Myrtle Beach, South Carolina, Baltimore, Toronto, Albany, New York, Rochester, New York, Denver, Indianapolis, Los Angeles, Cincinnati, Austin, Texas, San Antonio, Las Vegas, Philadelphia, New Haven, Connecticut, Chicago and at Radio City Music Hall in New York City. On the 1996 video for one of the live stage shows, Shotaro Ishinomori was credited as the writer.

== Dates ==
The tour included performances at locations such as:

- 12/13/1994: Los Angeles (Universal Amphitheatre)
- 12/29/1994: Worcester (The Centrum)
- 01/02/1995: Albany (Knickerbocker Arena)
- 01/05/1995: New Haven (New Haven Coliseum)
- 01/22/1995: New York City (Radio City Music Hall)
- 02/13/1995: Rochester (Rochester War Memorial)
- 02/24/1995: Fairfax (Patriot Center)
- 03/16/1995: Rosemont (Rosemont Horizon)
- 03/09/1996: Madrid, Spain (Pabellon Europa)
