= Sarutobi Ecchan =

Japanese manga series

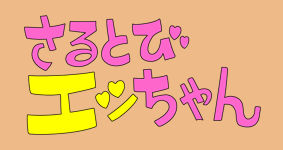

さるとびエッちゃん
- Genre: Comedy, magical girl
- Manga

Okashina Okashina Okashina Ano Ko
- Written by: Shotaro Ishinomori
- Published by: Shueisha
- Magazine: Margaret
- Original run: 1964 – 1966
- Volumes: 5
- Anime television series
- Directed by: Yugo Serikawa
- Studio: Toei Animation
- Original network: ANN (NET)
- Original run: 4 October 1971 – 27 March 1972
- Episodes: 26

Sarutobi Ecchan (さるとびエッちゃん) known in some countries as Hela Supergirl, is a Japanese manga series by Shotaro Ishinomori. It was originally named Okashina Okashina Okashina Ano Ko (おかしな おかしな おかしなあの子, Okashina Okashina Okashina Ano Ko) but was changed in 1971 when Toei Animation adapted it into an anime called Sarutobi Ecchan. The anime lasted 26 episodes. It has yet to be released on DVD in America; however, the series has been released on DVD in Japan.

Ecchan appears to be a normal young girl, but appearances can be deceptive. She is descended from the great ninja Sasuke Sarutobi and possesses ninja skills of her own. Ecchan is also capable of all sorts of extraordinary feats: she can communicate with animals, possesses hypnotic and telepathic abilities, and is stronger and more intelligent than normal girls of her age. But despite all this, Ecchan is still only a young girl, and, like any young girl, she makes mistakes. But with the help of her friends Miko, Taihei and her dog Buku, everything always turns out right.

Since it was cancelled due to low ratings, the series was unsuccessful to continue its run, and there is not a proper ending for Ecchan. The last episode focuses around an American Ecchan doppelganger named Eiko, who wants nothing more than to see Mount Fuji.

== Episode list ==
1. "The Strange Transfer Student"
2. "My Home"
3. "Mama Comes to School"
4. "My First Field Day/Ah, Friendship"
5. "There, There, Ababa"
6. "Where Is Buku?/The Happy Couple"
7. "The Boy from the Stars"
8. "My Nearby Homeland"
9. "Goodbye and Farewell"
10. "A Mother's Hand"
11. "Even if I'm Small"
12. "I Love Christmas"
13. "Song of the Snowy Mountains"
14. "Look Here, Woof Woof/The Fun Ecchan Playing Card Game"
15. "My Beloved Marie"
16. "My Animal Language Classroom"
17. "My Seven Colored Dreams, My Movie Dreams"
18. "Devils out, Happiness In!"
19. "Buku and Chibimaru"
20. "Father's Home Economics"
21. "The Strange, Strange Assistant"
22. "Oh, God!!"
23. "The Dreamy Girl"
24. "The Small Garden"
25. "Etsuko, the Wolf Girl"
26. "Etsuko Times Two"
