= Mitsuo Hashimoto (manga artist) =

Japanese manga artist

- Born: November 5, 1955 (age 71); Sayama city, Saitama Prefecture, Japan
- Occupation: manga artist

Mitsuo Hashimoto (はしもと みつお or 橋本 光男, Hashimoto Mitsuo; born 5 November 1955 in Sayama, Saitama Prefecture, Japan) is a Japanese manga artist. After winning an honorable mention at the 11th Tezuka Awards in 1976 for his work Mīnya no Negai, he made his professional debut the following year in a special issue of Weekly Shōnen Jump with his work The Two Are Rivals (二人はライバル, Futari wa Raibaru). Since that time, he has published works in a variety of Shogakukan shōnen and seinen manga magazines.

His definitive works include Tsukiji Uogashi Sandaime (art) and Itsumo Hōkago. Manga artist Hidenori Hara was his assistant for a time. Hashimoto was the assistant for Motoka Murakami for a time.

== Works ==
All works are published by Shogakukan unless otherwise indicated.

- Ganbare! Donbe (1978–1980, CoroCoro Comic, 2 volumes)
- Ore wa Namuzumono (1982–1984, written by Jūzō Yamasaki, Weekly Shōnen Sunday, 6 volumes)
- Barairo Eleven (1985, Big Comic, 4 volumes)
- Tensai Donbe (1986–1988, CoroCoro Comic, 8 volumes)
- Itsumo Hōkago (1990-?, Big Comic, 7 volumes)
- Fūfu Seikatsu (1990–1991, written by Yūji Nishi, Big Comic, 6 volumes)
- Hanatare Gakuen (1991–1992, SP Comics, 2 volumes)
- Station (1992–1996, written by Ken'ichi Ōishi, Big Comic Original, 6 volumes)
- Kibō no Isu (1996–1997, Big Comic, 2 volumes)
- Mizcov (1996–2000, written by Gregory, Big Comic Original, 5 volumes)
- Tōen (1999–2000, written by Daiki Harada, Big Comic Superior, 2 volumes)
- Radio no Tantei (2000, written by Yūji Nishi, Big Comic, 1 volume)
- Tsukiji Uogashi Sandaime (2000-current, written by Ken'ichi Ōishi (vol.1), Masaharu Nabeshima (vol.2-20), Kazuto Kuwa (vol.21-current), Big Comic, 26 volumes (as of March 2009))
- Shuppatsu, Shingo!! (2006–2009, written by Yūichirō Sueda, Manga Time, 2 volumes, ja)
- Tetsu no Hosomichi (2008-current, Comic Charge, Kadokawa Shoten, 2 volumes (as of March 2009), ja)
