= Baiyaku Kakebachō Kazuryū =

Japanese manga series

- First tankōbon volume cover

買厄懸場帖 九頭竜
- Genre: Historical drama
- Manga
- Written by: Shotaro Ishinomori
- Published by: Shogakukan
- Magazine: Big Comic
- Original run: January 10, 1974 – January 10, 1975
- Volumes: 3
- Manga
- Written by: Shotaro Ishinomori
- Illustrated by: Akira Miyagawa
- Published by: Leed Publishing
- Magazine: Comic Ran
- Original run: May 27, 2015 – November 28, 2016
- Volumes: 3

Baiyaku Kakebachō Kazuryū (Japanese: 買厄懸場帖 九頭竜; 'Register of Clients of a Medicine Seller: Kazuryū') is a Japanese manga series written and illustrated by Shotaro Ishinomori. It was serialized in Shogakukan's seinen manga magazine Big Comic from January 1974 to January 1975, with its chapters collected in three tankōbon volumes. A Remake illustrated by Akira Miyagawa serialized in Leed Publishing's Comic Ran magazine from May 2015 to November 2016.

== Publication ==
Written and illustrated by Shotaro Ishinomori, Baiyaku Kakebachō Kazuryū was serialized in Shogakukan's seinen manga magazine Big Comic from January 10, 1974, to January 10, 1975. Shogakukan collected its chapters in three tankōbon volumes. In France, the manga is licensed by Kana.

A Remake of Ishinomori's manga illustrated by Akira Miyagawa began serialization in Leed Publishing's Comic Ran magazine on May 27, 2015. (Note: It started in the magazine's July issue of 2015 (cover date), which was released on May 27.) The series finished serialization on November 28, 2016. (Note: It ended in the magazine's January issue of 2017 (cover date), which was released on November 28.) Leed Publishing collected its chapters in three volumes, released from December 26, 2015, to January 27, 2017.

=== Remake ===
No.	Release date	ISBN
1	December 26, 2015	978-4-84-584834-8
2	August 27, 2016	978-4-84-584841-6
3	January 27, 2017	978-4-84-584842-3
