= Tsukiji Uogashi Sandaime =

Japanese manga series

- First volume cover

築地魚河岸三代目
- Genre: Cooking
- Manga
- Written by: Ken'ichi Ōishi (vol.1); Masaharu Nabeshima (vol.2-20); Kazuto Kuwa (21-42)
- Illustrated by: Mitsuo Hashimoto
- Published by: Shogakukan
- Magazine: Big Comic
- Original run: November 2000 – April 2014
- Volumes: 42
- Live-action film

The Taste of Fish
- Directed by: Shingo Matsubara
- Studio: Shochiku
- Released: June 7, 2008
- Runtime: 116 minutes

Tsukiji Uogashi Sandaime (築地魚河岸三代目; "Tsukiji Fish Market – Third Generation") is a Japanese manga series by Masaharu Nabeshima with art by Mitsuo Hashimoto. It has been adapted into a 2008 Japanese film directed by Shingo Matsubara. The film was intended to be part of a series.

== Film ==
=== Cast ===
- Takao Osawa (Shuntaro Akagi)
- Rena Tanaka (Asuka)
- Tsuyoshi Ihara
- Yoko Moriguchi
- Shirō Itō
- Akira Emoto

== Reception ==
The film was released in Japan on 259 theaters and has made US$2,234,531 at the box office. It was one of the films in competition for the Golden Cup award for best film at the 2008 Shanghai International Film Festival.
