= Tsuyoshi Nakaima =

Japanese manga artist (born 1960)

Tsuyoshi Nakaima なかいま 強
- Born: April 13, 1960 (age 66) USCAR
- Area: Manga artist
- Notable works: Wataru Ga Pyun! Ucchare Goshogawara; The Golden Rough
- Awards: 43rd Shōnen Shogakukan Manga Award (1989)

Tsuyoshi Nakaima (なかいま 強, Nakaima Tsuyoshi) is a Japanese manga artist who is the author and artist of sports manga.

== Career ==
Nakaima is best known for the Sumo series Ucchare Goshogawara, for which he received the 1989 Shogakukan Manga Award in shōnen category. and which got an OVA adaptation in 1991.

Between 1999 and 2011, his golf manga The Golden Rough (Ougon no Rough ~Sōta no Stance~) was released in 33 tankōbon volumes.

Nakaima was an avid baseball player throughout high school and college but had to quit after shoulder injury. He became an assistant to Akio Chiba before creating manga on his own.

Nakaima is from Okinawa and it has been noted how some of his character use Okinawan Japanese.

== Selected works ==
- Wataru Ga Pyun (わたるがぴゅん!; 1984–2004) - Monthly Shōnen Jump - 58 volumes - baseball
- Ucchare Goshogawara (うっちゃれ五所瓦; 1988–1991) - Weekly Shōnen Sunday - 12 volumes - sumo
- Ougon no Rough (黄金のラフ; 1999–2011) - Big Comic - 33 volumes - professional golf
- Rice Shoulder (ライスショルダー; 2007–2013) - Weekly Morning - 16 volumes - women's boxing
- Ougon no RoughII (黄金のラフII; 2014 -) - Big Comic - professional golf
