= Shotaro Ishinomori =

Japanese manga artist

- Born: Shotaro Onodera; 25 January 1938; Tome, Miyagi Prefecture, Japan
- Died: 28 January 1998 (aged 60); Bunkyō, Tokyo, Japan
- Occupation: Manga artist
- Writing career
- Period: 1954–1998
- Notable works: Kamen Rider; Super Sentai; Cyborg 009; Ganbare!! Robocon; Sarutobi Ecchan
- Notable awards: Tezuka Osamu Cultural Prize (1998)
- Website: ishimoripro.com

Shotaro Ishinomori (石ノ森 章太郎, Ishinomori Shōtarō; 25 January 1938 – 28 January 1998), né Onodera (小野寺 章太郎, Onodera Shōtarō), was a Japanese manga artist, cartoonist, writer and director. Known as the "King of Manga" (漫画の帝王 (Manga no Teiō) or 漫画の王様 (Manga no Ōsama)), he is regarded as one of the greatest and most influential manga artists of all time. Outside of manga he is also one of the most prolific creators in the history of anime, tokusatsu, and Japanese superhero fiction, creating several immensely popular long-running series such as Cyborg 009, the Super Sentai series (later adapted into the Power Rangers series which Ishinomori has also been credited for co-creating), and the Kamen Rider series. He was twice awarded by the Shogakukan Manga Awards, in 1968 for Sabu to Ichi Torimono Hikae and in 1988 for Hotel and Manga Nihon Keizai Nyumon.

He was also known as Shotaro Ishimori (石森 章太郎, Ishimori Shōtarō) prior to 1986, when he changed his family name to Ishinomori by adding the no (ノ) character in katakana.

== Biography ==
In December 1954, Ishinomori published his first work, Nikyuu Tenshi, in Manga Shōnen. In 1956, he moved to Tokyo and became an assistant to Osamu Tezuka. During his time working under Tezuka, Ishinomori worked on Astro Boy and Alakazam the Great. In 1960, Ishinomori published Flying Phantom Ship, which was later turned into an animated feature film in 1969.

Cyborg 009, created in 1964, became the first superpowered hero team created in Japan, featuring nine cybernetic warriors. The success of the tokusatsu superhero TV series Kamen Rider, produced by Toei Company in 1971, led to the birth of the "transforming" (henshin) superhero (human-sized superheroes who transform by doing a pose, and use martial arts to fight henchmen and the weekly monster), and resulted in many sequel shows to this day.

Ishinomori then created many similar superhero dramas, which were once again all produced by Toei or in Sarutobi Ecchan's case Toei Animation, including Android Kikaider, Kikaider 01, Henshin Ninja Arashi, Suki! Suki!! Majou Sensei, Inazuman, Robotto Keiji, Himitsu Sentai Gorenger (the first Super Sentai series), Kaiketsu Zubat, Akumaizer 3, Sarutobi Ecchan, the Toei Fushigi Comedy Series, and countless others. He created popular children's shows, such as Hoshi no Ko Chobin (Chobin, Child of the Stars, 1974, a co-production with Studio Zero which was a major success on Italian television) and Ganbare!! Robokon.

In 1963, he founded the anime company Studio Zero. From 1967 to 1970, the manga 009-1 was serialized in the Futabasha publication Weekly Manga Action. It was written and illustrated by Ishinomori. There was a television drama of it in 1969 and eventually an anime in 2006.

Ishinomori's art was reminiscent of that of his mentor, Osamu Tezuka. The true story of his first meeting with Tezuka was illustrated in a short four-page tale drawn up as supplementary material for the 1970s Astro Boy manga reprints. In 1954, Ishinomori submitted his first official work, Nikyu Tenshi, to a contest seeking new talent in the magazine, Manga Shōnen. Tezuka was impressed by his drawings and sent a telegraph to Ishinomori, asking him to work as his assistant with Astro Boy. In the American release, this story can be seen in Volume 15, along with Ishinomori's earliest work on the "Electro" story arc. After graduating from high school in 1956 Ishinomori moved to Tokiwa-so with Tezuka, and lived there until the end of 1961.

Ishinomori illustrated a comic adaptation of the Super NES video game The Legend of Zelda: A Link to the Past, which was produced for the American publication Nintendo Power. The comic consisted of 12 chapters, which were serialized from January 1992 (Volume 32) to December 1992 (Volume 43). The comic was republished as a graphic novel collection in 1993, and, as of 2015, is back in print through Viz Media. He has been credited for some work with the Power Rangers, including videos, video games, the 1996 video of a Mighty Morphin Power Rangers World Tour Live on Stage event and the Power Rangers Zeo, Power Rangers Turbo and Power Rangers in Space tv series.

At the end of 1997, Kazuhiko Shimamoto, a young and up-and-coming manga artist was contacted by an increasingly ill Ishinomori and asked if he would do a continuation, though more along the lines of a remake, of his 100-page, one-shot manga from 1970, Skull Man, the manga that became the basis for Kamen Rider. Ishinomori, who had been one of Shimamoto's boyhood heroes, faxed him copies of the proposed story and plot notes. Shimamoto was astounded that he had been chosen to work on his idol's final, great work.

Shimamoto had already been involved in the revival of one of Ishinomori's other earlier works (including Kamen Rider) but little did he dream that, as only one of many whom Ishinomori had inspired, he would be chosen for the final collaboration and resurrection of Skull Man. It was also adapted into an anime in 2007.

== Death and legacy ==
Ishinomori died of lymphoma and heart failure on 28 January 1998, just three days after his 60th birthday. His final work was the tokusatsu superhero TV series, Voicelugger, which was televised in 1999. In 2000, the Kamen Rider series was revived with Kamen Rider Kuuga. All of the series made in the Heisei era onwards credit Ishinomori as the creator. In 2001, Ishinomori Manga Museum named in his honor opened in Ishinomaki, Miyagi. Special trains in the Senseki Line were commissioned featuring his artwork generally leading to the museum.

His work posthumously awarded him the Guinness World Record for most comics published by one author, totaling over 128,000 pages across 770 titles across 500 volumes.

His influence, particularly on superhero media, is such that he has often drawn comparisons in the west as being the manga counterpart to both Stan Lee and Jack Kirby.

Many manga artists have cited Ishinomori as an influence, including Katsuhiro Otomo, Naoki Urasawa, Go Nagai, Kazuhiko Shimamoto, Keiko Takemiya, Moto Hagio, Taiyo Matsumoto, Tetsuya Chiba and Tetsuo Hara. Takemiya called him the 'flag-bearer of our time'. Hagio cited his influence on her drawing technique, stating that his images were 'truly marvelous'.

One of Tezuka's former assistants, Shigeto Ikehara, stated Ishinomori to be one of the two cartoonists that Tezuka was ever truly jealous of (the other being Otomo). Ikehara stated that while Tezuka felt that he could not draw in a more realistic style than Otomo, with Ishinomori, he felt that he could not beat him with an Ishinomori-style manga.

In a variation of 'The Top 100 Historical Persons in Japan' poll held in 2006, asking for the 'Greatest Geniuses in History', Ishinomori ranked 79th. The only other manga artists on this list were Osamu Tezuka and Fujiko F. Fujio.

Fuku Suzuki portrays a young Ishinomori in Saber + Zenkaiger: Superhero Senki.

== Selected works ==
Manga
Year(s)	Original title	Translated title	Volumes
1954–55	二級天使	Nikyuu Tenshi	2
1959–64	竜神沼	Ryuujin Numa / Dragon God Pond	2
1959–67	テレビ小僧	TV Kid	2
1960-61	空飛ぶゆうれい船	Flying Phantom Ship	1
1964–81	サイボーグ009	Cyborg 009	36
1964–69	さるとびエッちゃん	Sarutobi Ecchan	5
1965	ボンボン	Bon Bon	4
1965–66	ミュータント・サブ	Mutant Sabu	3
1966–72	佐武と市捕物控	Sabu and Ichi's Detective Memoirs	17
1967–74	009ノ1	009-1	6
1967-68	ドンキッコ	Donkikko	2
1967–68	幻魔大戦	Genma Wars	2
1967–71	ジュン - 章太郎のファンタジーワールド	Shoutaro's Fantasy World Jun	2
1969–70	リュウの道	The Road of Ryuu	8
1970	CM野郎	CM Guy	1
1970	スカルマン	The Skull Man	1
1971	宮本武蔵	Miyamoto Musashi	2
1971	原始少年リュウ	Primitive Boy Ryu	3
1971	劇画家畜人ヤプー	Domestic Yapoo	1
1971–72	仮面ライダー	Kamen Rider	4
1972–73	ロボット刑事	Robot Keiji	3
1972–73	変身忍者 嵐	Transforming Ninja Arashi	3
1972–74	キカイダー	Kikaider	6
1973–74	イナズマン	Inazuman	4
1974–75	買厄懸場帖 九頭竜	Baiyaku Kakebachō Kazuryū	3
1974–75	星の子チョビン	Chobin the Star Child	1
1975–76	秘密戦隊ゴレンジャー	Himitsu Sentai Gorenger	2
1976–78	ギルガメッシュ	Gilgamesh	6
1976–77	ドッグワールド	Dog World	3
1977–78	多羅尾伴内 七つの顔をもつ男	The Man With Seven Faces	5
1979–81	幻魔大戦 -神話前夜の章	Genma Wars: Eve of Mythology	4
1983–84	八百八町表裏 化粧師	808 Ward Inside and Out: Make-Up Artist	3
1984–98	Hotel	Hotel	37
1986	マンガ日本経済入門	Japan Inc.: An Introduction to Japanese Economics	2
1986–87	北斎	Hokusai	3
1987–88	仮面ライダーBlack	Kamen Rider Black	6
1988	人間の條件	The Human Condition	4
1989–94	仮面ライダーZO	Kamen Rider ZO	1
1992	ゼルダの伝説～神々のトライフォース	The Legend of Zelda: A Link to the Past	1
1994	古事記 (石ノ森章太郎)	Kojiki	1
1996–97	シャーロック・ホームズシリーズ	Sherlock Holmes Series	10
