= WVLT =

WVLT may refer to:

- WVLT (AM), a radio station (1270 AM) licensed to Vineland, New Jersey, United States
- WVLT-FM, a radio station (92.1 FM) licensed to Vineland, New Jersey
- WVLT-TV, a CBS-affiliated television station (channel 34, virtual 8) licensed to Knoxville, Tennessee, United States
