= Wee Willie Webber Colorful Cartoon Club =

- Presented by: Bill "Wee Willie" Webber
- Country of origin: United States
- No. of seasons: 10
- No. of episodes: 2,500

Production
- Running time: 3–4 hours

Original release
- Network: WPHL-TV
- Release: 1965 – 1975

The Wee Willie Webber Colorful Cartoon Club is an after-school local children's television program which aired on WPHL-TV in Philadelphia, Pennsylvania for 10 years from 1965 to 1975. It was hosted by local Television/Radio personality Bill "Wee Willie" Webber. Webber was the first voice and face of WPHL-TV when it signed on the air on September 17, 1965. The show ran for 3–4 hours in the late afternoon (typically 3:00 PM–6:00 PM) and was one of the first successful programs on UHF.

Webber introduced a variety of Japanese anime cartoons, including 8th Man, Astro Boy, Marine Boy, Prince Planet, Kimba the White Lion and Speed Racer. Other shows included Ultraman, Spider-Man, The Patty Duke Show, The Brady Bunch, Gilligan's Island, The Man from U.N.C.L.E., Voyage to the Bottom of the Sea, The Friendly Giant, Casper the Friendly Ghost, Milton the Monster, Rocket Robin Hood, George of the Jungle, The High Chaparral, The King Kong Show, Buck Rogers, The Three Stooges, The Lone Ranger and Daniel Boone. The theme song for the program was "Yakety Sax" by Boots Randolph.

Once a week, the show featured a live studio audience of kids. This "Peanut Gallery" played games on-air, including Musical Chairs, and won prizes for telling jokes or attempting to whistle after stuffing their mouths with Ritz Crackers. At the height of the show's popularity, there was a one-year waiting period to get a ticket.

Regular characters on the show included a bear puppet named Ralph, Charlie ChinChopper (eyes drawn on Webber's chin, then the image inverted via a set of mirrors), and the Bluebird of Happiness. Webber often took the show on the road, broadcasting from various locations, including Willow Grove Park, Dorney Park & Wildwater Kingdom, Hershey Park, the Mann Recreation Center, Hawaii and Rome, Italy. In 1970, the show traveled to Bavaria Film Studios in Munich, Germany for a behind the scenes look at the filming of Willy Wonka & the Chocolate Factory.

From 1976 to 1979, Webber hosted a similar show on WKBS-TV.
