= Astro Boy (1980 TV series) =

1980 anime television series

- English title card
- 鉄腕アトム
- Based on: Astro Boy by Osamu Tezuka
- Directed by: Noboru Ishiguro
- Music by: Shigeaki Saegusa
- Country of origin: Japan
- Original language: Japanese
- No. of episodes: 52 (list of episodes)

Production
- Producers: Hidehiko Takei (NTV); Satoshi Yamamoto (Tezuka Productions)
- Production companies: Nippon Television; Tezuka Productions

Original release
- Network: NNS (NTV)
- Release: October 1, 1980 – December 23, 1981

Related
- Astro Boy (1951 manga); Mighty Atom (1959 TV series); Astro Boy (1963 TV series); The Original Astro Boy; Astro Boy (2003 TV series)

Astro Boy (鉄腕アトム, Tetsuwan Atomu; lit. 'Mighty Atom'), sometimes referred to as New Mighty Atom (新・鉄腕アトム, Shin Tetsuwan Atomu), a 1980 anime series and a color remake of the 1963 black-and-white series of the same name. Both are adaptations of the manga series of the same name by Osamu Tezuka.

This series places more focus on the titular Astro Boy's robotic abilities and has a darker tone than previous incarnations of the series. Although this series places much more emphasis on action scenes than the first one, the theme of "robots with hearts" is still prevalent in this anime. It is also the last Astro Boy work that Tezuka himself wrote and directed, and the humor of the story and direction that is typical of Tezuka can be seen throughout. The English dubs cut out some of the series' more violent moments, such as Astro being beheaded in the episode "Lilly on Peligro Island" and Blackie Young and his crew destroying the robot guard and factory owner in the episode "Blackie Young".

The original Japanese version of the series ran for 52 color episodes, while the English dubs (American and Canadian) ran for 51 episodes. The English dubbed version also combined the first two episodes of the series into a single half hour show, omitting the entirety of the backstory for the main antagonist Atlas.

== Plot ==
The first episode takes place in the year 2030 in Tokyo, Japan. Dr. Tenma, the Minister of Science, is attempting to create a robot capable of expressing human emotions. After his fourth failed attempt, Tenma is approached by Skunk Kusai, a man who offers him an "Omega Factor" circuit which, when installed, will humanize a robot. After rejecting Skunk's offer and throwing him out, Tenma's nine-year-old son, Tobio, suggests his father make a robot shaped like a child.

Inspired by his son, Tenma sets off to the Ministry of Science to work, forgetting his promise to take Tobio to an amusement park. Upset by his father's neglect, Tobio drives an aerocar home but crashes into an oncoming truck, dying in the process. Just before he dies, Tobio makes his father promise to name his boy robot "Tobio" and make it the strongest robot in the world, while still loving it like a son. Tenma then creates a 100,000-horsepower (75,000 kW) robot capable of flight, equipped with lasers and machine guns. However, Skunk obtains the blueprints, duplicates them, and takes them to the evil Count Walpurgis, who aspires to put the Omega Factor into a super robot and use it for world domination.

Afraid of the potential threat Tenma's robot son could pose to humanity, the Prime Minister of Japan orders the robot dismantled by the next night. Tenma, however, secretly finishes constructing the robot that night, only showing his two assistants that "Tobio" exists, and takes him home to raise him. After various mishaps with raising the robot, Tobio's mind suddenly goes blank, his eyes start blinking red, and he is summoned to wait in the middle of town. Atlas, Walpurgis' new super robot, had been activated and was connecting to Tobio. When the connection process fails, Tobio regains his senses, only to come under attack from a robot disposal tank piloted by Tenma, Honda, and Ushiyama. Something goes wrong and the tank malfunctions and goes berserk. Tobio recovers and saves everyone in the vicinity. Recovering in the hospital, Tenma realizes the public will discover that Tobio exists, and decides to take Tobio on an ocean cruise to America.

Tobio struggles to control his strength. After a disastrous meal on the cruise, Tenma disowns Tobio. Tobio hides on deck and is tricked into signing himself into a contract of slavery to the ringmaster Hamegg, who runs the Robot Circus. Tobio spots Atlas nearby and tries to attack him, but Tobio loses most of his energy in the process. Hamegg then shuts him in his suitcase. Tenma soon regrets his actions and begins searching for Tobio. At the circus, Tobio is renamed "Mighty Atom/Astro Boy" and is cruelly treated by Hamegg, but taught and cared for by a performer named Kathy, who shows him kindness and compassion. Dr. Ochanomizu, a local scientist, discovers Tenma's lost robot at the circus and, with Kathy's help, smuggles Astro Boy out of the circus. Dr. Ochanomizu becomes the new head of the Ministry of Science. From there, Astro Boy learns more about the world and becomes the defender of Tokyo and beyond.

== Production ==
The original author, Osamu Tezuka, dissatisfied with the earlier adaptations produced by Mushi Production, developed the 1980 series with Tezuka Productions as a new retelling of Astro Boy's origin. The fact that the first series was in black-and-white and was not rerun very often, and that it was not broadcast outside Japan, was also cited as a reason for the remake. The plan for the reboot was brought up in 1970 and 1971, but was abandoned, and it was not until 1974 that the project was launched. Rights Issues also prevented Tezuka from bringing back Astro Boy during the 1970s, leading him to create a similar series called Jetter Mars instead. After the rights issues were resolved, Tezuka Productions produced the new Astro Boy series in color with fewer creative and budget restriction than the original adaptation. The plan for this series was realized due to the popularity of the Osamu Tezuka special animation that NTV had been airing on 24 Hour TV: Love Saves the Earth since the first edition in 1978. The contract was made directly between Tezuka Productions and NTV, not through an advertising agency.

As in the first series, Tezuka himself participated as a staff member in charge of scripts, storyboards, direction, and key animation. In this series, the first episode is set in the year 2030, which is a change from both the year 2003, the year of Astro Boy's birth in the original manga, and the year 2013 in the first anime. Since the music director was Seiji Suzuki, the sound effects used in the previous shows The Rose of Versailles and Lupin the Third Part II are used throughout, as both were broadcast on NTV and were available for use. It was customary at the time to change the voice actors every time the broadcasting station changed, but at Tezuka's request, Mari Shimizu as Atom and Hisashi Katsuta as Dr. Ochanomizu were retained from the previous series.

The opening theme was initially commissioned to Yasuo Higuchi, but when the demo tape was played to an overseas buyer with whom a contract was negotiated, he was very unhappy with it, saying, "What part of this is Atom?". Thus, the opening of the previous anime was arranged in a modern style and used in various arrangements during the series, but viewers complained to Tezuka and the broadcasting station about why the original music was not used as it was.

The art was handled by Setsuko Ishizu, while Kunio Aoi designed its mechanical elements. Shigeaki Saeguso made the music and arranged an opening theme, "Astro Boy", which featured lyrics by Shuntaro Tanikawa and vocals by Atoms. Sauego also made "Towards the future", and "Uran's Theme". Osamu Tezuka wrote the lyrics for "Towards the Future", while Toyohisa made the lyrics for "Urans" theme. The production updated the stories from the earlier adaptation for the audience. It also expanded Astro Boy's conflict with Atlas into a nine-episode storyline. According to Tezuka productions, Tezuka used their conflict to demonstrate that both good and evil have weaknesses.

In the final episode broadcast at the end of 1981, a live-action video of Tezuka himself giving a message was shown at the beginning. This video was shot by Tezuka's son, Makoto Tezuka, at his request. However, in the ending of the episode, Hisaya Tamate is credited as the cinematographer, while Makoto is credited as the director.

== Characters ==
=== Atom/Astro Boy ===
Astro has a strong sense of morality and is always gentle and kind towards others. Astro is a superpowered robot, with seven secret super powers. He is designed to look exactly like Tobio, the son of his creator. Dr. Tenma initially treated Astro like a real boy as a replacement for his son who died in a car accident. However, Astro Boy was clumsy from his inability to control his strength. After being rejected by Dr. Tenma, Astro joins Hamegg's Robot Circus, where he learns to control his powers and meets Dr. Ochanomizu. He is unsure of his destiny in the beginning, but he gains confidence as the story unfolds.

Throughout the series, Atlas attempts to persuade Astro to help Atlas conquer the world. By design, both Astro and Atlas were created from the same blueprints, and so they are considered to be brothers. However, Astro refuses to help Atlas in his quest for world domination. He is voiced by Mari Shimizu, Patricia Kugler Whitely (American version) and then-12-year-old Steven Bednarski (Canadian version).

=== Uran ===
- Sarah (Canadian dub), Uranie (French dub)

Uran is Astro's naive but determined little sister. She was "born" on New Years Day, built by Dr. Ochanomizu as a gift to Astro. She has half the power of her brother (with 50,000 horsepower) but is quite powerful. Uran is depicted as a cute, tomboyish little girl.

Despite this, Uran is generally a good-hearted girl and is shown to be rather attached to Astro and generally looks up to him. (This is shown after he saves her from becoming a slave in episode 14.)

In contrast to the 1960s series, Uran occupied a less prominent position in the general storyline, and her appearance was revised to make her softer and rounder, possibly to appeal to female viewers. Many times, she was the star of a few episodes, all of which had a special ending theme with pictures of Uran in costumes. Uran is voiced by Masako Sugaya in the Japanese dub and by Becky Wilenski in the American version.

=== Dr. Tenma/Dr. Boynton ===
- Doctor Boynton (American dub), Professor Balfus (Canadian dub)

After several robot design failures, Dr. Tenma created Astro Boy from a suggestion from his son, Tobio. Dr. Tenma zealously worked on creating a robot that would be able to act and behave like a real human. In his search to obtain his goal, Dr. Tenma neglected Tobio, forgetting his promise to take his son to the amusement park. As a result, Tobio decides to go on his own and crashes the robot car, dying from the accident.

Dr. Tenma continues to work on the boy robot. Once completed, he calls the robot Tobio (Astro Boy), after his deceased son. However, Astro Boy's inability to control his own strength begins to infuriate Dr. Tenma, and while on a cruise, Dr. Tenma angrily disowns the robot. Dr. Tenma is last seen mournfully calling out for Tobio, and is not seen through the remainder of the series. He is voiced by Tamio Ōki, and Del Lewis (American version).

=== Dr. Ochanomizu/Dr. Elefun ===
- Dr. Elefun (American dub), Dr. Cole Green, later Professor Peabody (Canadian Dub), Professor Caudrine (French dub)

Succeeding Dr. Tenma as Minister of Science, Dr. Ochanomizu rescues Astro Boy from Hamegg's Robot Circus. Dr. Ochanomizu is a robot rights advocate and creates the "Robot Bill of Rights", which allows robots to be of equal status of humans. He often acts as a surrogate father for Astro Boy, providing him with advice and information. Early into the series, Dr. Ochanomizu builds Astro a mother, father, and a little sister named Uran. He is voiced by Hisashi Katsuta and Brian Parry (American version).

=== Atlas ===
Astro's brother and archenemy, he was created by Walpurgis and Skunk who copied Astro's original design plans. Atlas was designed with a similar, childlike look and was planned to be used in theft, but Atlas was too naive and unprepared for criminal use. Only Livian, Walpurgis' robot maid, showed him any kind of compassion or kindness; he reciprocates in turn, considering her his only true friend. Walpurgis installed an Omega Factor into Atlas during his construction, which allowed him to defy the robot laws. After attacking Walpurgis and Skunk for destroying Livian and being heavily damaged himself, he rebuilt his own body and Livian's, along with a horse and an electric sword. The new Atlas believed robots were superior to human beings and repeatedly asked Astro to join him in taking over the world. Atlas and Astro share many of the same powers and abilities.

The new Atlas and Livian are adult in appearance. Over the course of the series, Atlas gained a floating crystal castle. He dealt with Skunk and then Walpurgis, whom he killed off for good after his creator blackmailed him to use a powerful destructive cannon by planting a bomb in Livian's body as a fail-safe. However, Livian escaped from Walpurgis' grasp and Atlas pulverized him alongside his Castle after retrieving Livian. Later, Atlas sacrifices himself and Livian to save Earth from alien invaders. He is voiced by Katsuji Mori and Paul Nelson (American version).

=== Higeoyaji/Daddy Walrus ===
- Victor (later Percival) Pompous (American dub, first animated series) Daddy Walrus (American dub, second animated series), Max McNugget (Canadian dub), Monsieur Morse (French dub)

Real name Shunsaku Ban (Albert Duncan in the American dub), Daddy Walrus is Astro's teacher. Throughout the series, Mr. Pompous/Daddy Walrus is portrayed as a judo expert, an efficient private eye, and a keen flower arranger. As a trained martial artist, a recurring joke is Pompous reacting in terror when confronted but instantly rallying courage and "polishing off" an adversary twice his size. A sharp advocate for Robotic rights, he is one of Astro's strongest supporters, and frequently engages in vitriolic arguments with the formidable Inspector Gumshoe. While loud, brash, and comically short-tempered, Pompous/Daddy Walrus regards Astro and Uran with genuine affection and would willingly risk his life on their behalf. He is voiced by Kazuo Kumakura and Bob Gonzalez (American dub).

=== Livian ===
- Selena (Canadian dub), Vivian (French dub)

Livian was formerly Walpurgis' robot maid, who befriended the young Atlas and took care of him. She was destroyed for accidentally breaking a decorative gargoyle and, as a result, Atlas went hysterical and attacked Walpurgis. Atlas rebuilt Livian and himself as adult robots, making Livian look like a princess. She is the only person to show compassion to Atlas and, in turn, he never harms her. Livian once leaves his crystal castle to warn Astro about Atlas's plans, and later tells Astro that he and Atlas are brothers. She is voiced by Keiko Yokozawa and Becky Wilenski (American version).

=== Jump ===
- Blip (Canadian dub), Plume (French dub)

Jump is a yellow dog with brown patches and the pet dog of Tobio. Jump was loyal to his master and rushed to the scene after Tobio crashed the car and died. When Astro was first introduced to Jump, Jump was afraid and didn't like him. It is unknown how Dr. Ochanomizu found him, but when Astro visits his new home and parents for the first time, Jump is also with them. Jump grows to like Astro and his family, though Uran does not have the same amount of respect for Jump that Astro has.

=== Skunk Kusai ===
- Slippery (Canadian dub), Sirius (French dub)

An enigmatic thief and mob leader in Tokyo, known for his blue skin and bloodhound eyes. In the beginning of the series, he works with Walpurgis in order to copy Astro's design blueprints. Skunk was assigned to teach Atlas, but, after becoming frustrated with him, the majority of the teaching was done by Livian. After Skunk set up Astro and Atlas's first battle, Walpurgis destroyed Livian, and Skunk just barely got away from Atlas's hysterical backlash.

Skunk went to Tokyo and started up a gang, whom briefly used the adult Atlas to commit several robberies when Atlas returned. Throughout the rest of the series, Skunk utilizes various robots for his own doings, most famously in the episode "The Light Ray Robot". He develops a strong hate for Astro because of the boy's constant interference with Skunk's work. At times, the latter tries to destroy or taunt him. He is voiced by Seizō Katō and Jay Rath (American version).

=== Tobio Tenma ===
- Toby Boynton (American dub)

A nine-year-old boy who is the son of Doctor Tenma who was fatally wounded in a car accident. After being neglected by his father, he goes in his car alone and crashes into an oncoming truck. Whilst on his deathbed at the Tokyo hospital, he tells his father to create a robot who looks like him and raise him like a son. He dies in his father's arms after speaking his last words. He is voiced by Mari Shimizu, Patricia Kugler Whitely (American version) and Steven Bednarski (Canadian version).

=== Others ===
- Astro's Dad – Voiced by: Takeshi Kuwabara (Japanese); Richard Ganoung (English)
- Astro's Mom – Voiced by: Misako Hibino (Japanese); Kahlei Slick (English)
- Detective Tawashi/Inspector Gumshoe – Voiced by: Ichirō Nagai (Japanese); Paul Nelson (English)
- Detective Nakamura/Chief McLaw – Voiced by: Yūsaku Yara (Japanese); Greg Zerkle (English)
- Kenichi/Kenneth – One of Astro's classmates. Voiced by: Kumiko Takizawa (Japanese); Dave Miller (English)
- Shibugaki/Alvin – One of Astro's classmates. Voiced by: Kazuya Tatekabe (Japanese); Richard Ganoung (English)
- Tamao/Theodore – One of Astro's classmates. Voiced by: Yōko Matsuoka (Japanese); Debbie Holmes (English)
- Midori/Mindy – One of Astro's classmates. Voiced by: Saeko Shimazu (Japanese); Becky Wilenski (English)
- Sultan/Saltan – Voiced by: Shōzō Iizuka (Japanese); Dave Miller (English)
- Ham Egg – Voiced by: Ichirō Nagai (Japanese); Greg Zerkle (English)
- Black Jack/Dr. Roget – Voiced by: Nachi Nozawa (Japanese); Brian Parry (English)
- Pinoco/Penny – Voiced by: Junko Hori (Japanese); Debbie Holmes (English)
- Rock – Voiced by: Yū Mizushima (Japanese); Dave Miller (English)

== Broadcast and release ==
There are two different English-language dubs. The first was coordinated by Tezuka Productions and Nippon TV and dubbed in 1982, which aired in Australia from 1983 to 1998. It had a very limited release in the U.S., where broadcasts were limited to syndication in a few markets, such as the Philadelphia-Wilmington area where it aired at 10:30 am weekdays in 1986 on what was then WTGI—channel 61. This is the version that was later released on DVD in both Australia and the United States. In the Philippines, the series was aired on RPN in the 1980s.

The second English dub was heavily edited and redubbed in Canada in 1985, solely for broadcast there. In the Canadian version, most of the characters had different names from their American counterparts. Due to laws which required a specific amount of Canadian content, the Canadian version also featured a pre-title sequence which recapped Astro's origin, and an epilogue where Astro would give a brief report about each episode's adventure to a computer named Geronimo. Astro's report would always contain a minor error about the story, and a narrator would encourage the viewers to find Astro's mistake, and compare answers with their friends. In India, the Hindi-dubbed version of this show was broadcast on Pogo from 2008 to 2009.

The aforementioned first dub of the 1980 series has since been released on DVD by Madman Entertainment and Manga Entertainment, although there are differences between the Madman and Manga Entertainment sets. Madman's set contains more deleted scenes, as well as the first two episodes, unedited (in Japanese with English subtitles). The Manga Entertainment set has a newly edited Japanese language track to go with the U.S. version of the first episode. As of March 2012, the Manga set is now out of print. On May 31, 2022, Discotek Media released the series on Blu-ray in North America.

The series premiered in Jamaica on CVM Television on March 16, 2017.

In 2020, the series became available for streaming on RetroCrush.

In 2021, an Arabic dub of the anime began streaming on Shahid, it follows the Japanese version closely but uses the characters' English dub names.

=== The "lost" episode ===
The first two episodes of the series were edited into one episode, completely removing the subplot of Atlas's origin. The two episodes are available in their complete state, in Japanese-with-subtitles only, on the Madman Entertainment DVD release. The two individual episodes (along with the other 50) can also be legally seen online in most countries with crowd-sourced subtitles on Viki.
