= List of Astro Boy (1980 TV series) episodes =

The 1980 Astro Boy series is a color remake of the 1960s anime black-and-white series of the same name; both series are adapted from the manga series of the same name by Osamu Tezuka. The series aired from October 1, 1980, to December 23, 1981. It had a very limited release in the U.S., where broadcasts were limited to syndication in a few markets, such as the Philadelphia-Wilmington area where it aired at 10:30 am weekdays in 1986 on what was then WTGI—channel 61.

== Episodes ==
J#	A#	Original title (English)/English Dub title Original title (Japanese)	Original air date (Japan)	Original air date (U.S.)
1	-	"The Birth of Atom" "ATOMU tanjō" (Japanese: アトム誕生)	October 1, 1980	-
Doctor Boynton is a robotics engineer struggling for a breakthrough, while his son Toby longs for his affection. One night, a shady criminal, Skunk Kusai, visits his home and offers Dr. Boynton a new circuit known as the Omega Factor, which would allow robots to become far more human-like, to the point of defying all Laws of Robotics. Boynton angrily throws him out of his home. Toby, having overheard their conversation, suggests to his father that he design a new robot that resembles a human boy. Boynton is inspired by this, and creates a new template for this design. However, he neglects his promise to spend time with Toby at an amusement park, hurting Toby's feelings. As Toby leaves the park, he is caught in a traffic collision and is horribly injured, and dies from his wounds in the hospital; before this, he has his father promise him to make the robot in his image and treat it like his own. Overcome with grief, Boynton completes the project, christening the new robot after his deceased son, and brings him to life. However, Skunk has copied the template designs as well, and takes them to a scientist named Walpurgis, who builds a robot he names Atlas. Boynton takes the robot Toby home, teaching him about life and how to live like a little boy. However, some time later Toby becomes paralyzed, his eyes blinking red, and disappears from Boynton's home. Boynton and his colleagues track Toby down using a robot tank, but the tank suddenly goes berserk with them inside, causing Toby to rush to save his father and his colleagues. Little do they realize that Toby's behavior was caused when Atlas was activated; the two robots had "called" one another. Later, in the hospital, Boynton tells Toby that he is very proud of him, but since he was no longer a secret, the two would have to leave the country for a while. Atlas and Walpurgis' robot maid, Livian, discuss his purpose, with Atlas uncertain of what lies ahead for him.
2	-	"Atom vs. Atlas" "ATOMU tai ATORASU" (Japanese: アトム対アトラス)	October 8, 1980	-
Dr. Boynton and Toby depart on an ocean liner for America, but Toby is unintentionally destructive, as he doesn't realize his own strength at times. Frustrated, Dr. Boynton has him stay in their cabin while he heads for dinner. However, a couple of guests want to meet Toby, so he has no choice but to bring him along. During the dinner, the guests realize that Toby is a robot, and even though he means no harm, manages to ruin the dinner by tipping the table over, causing a huge mess. Angrily, Boynton rejects Toby on the spot, declaring that he's just a robot and that he has no son. Meanwhile, Skunk Kusai has taken to educating Atlas in crime, teaching him how to rob armored trucks. Atlas, however, destroys the trucks before robbing them. Skunk then tries to teach him how to rob a supermarket, but Atlas, instead of stealing money, makes off with receipts instead. Frustrated with his incompetence, Skunk tells Walpurgis that Atlas is a fool and the Omega Factor has done nothing for him, but Walpurgis counters that Atlas is becoming more humanlike, and mistakes are a human factor in learning. Atlas, meanwhile, is consoled by Livian, who begs him not to follow a life of crime, but Atlas insists that he become more human to impress Walpurgis. Livian tells Atlas that a man must not harm those weaker than he, and even though they are robots, they also identify by gender. Atlas asks if Livian can be like his mother, as she is the only one who truly makes him happy. However, Skunk interrupts their talk to take Atlas on a mission. As Toby considers what Boynton said to him, he is approached by a shady circus owner, Hamegg, who asks if he would like to join the circus now that he had been disowned by Boynton. He takes Toby with him and coerces him into signing a contract, declaring Toby Hamegg's property. Meanwhile, Skunk tells Atlas that he plans to sink the ocean liner and have Atlas go in and steal a haul of gold bars on board. His plan is to create a field of icebergs in the path of the ship to cause it to crash. Setting off explosives, he creates a large flow of icebergs, but Toby manages to destroy the icebergs by breaking them up, saving the ship. He encounters Atlas, who attacks him and nearly destroys him until he recalls Livian's words. In a show of mercy, Atlas leaves Toby on the ship's deck, where he hears Boynton, who feels remorse for what he has done, calling out in desperation for him. However, he is found by Hamegg first, who grabs him and stuffs him in a crate. Atlas returns to Walpurgis' castle, where he finds that Walpurgis has dismantled Livian as punishment for her accidentally destroying a gargoyle sculpture. In a fit of rage, he attacks Walpurgis, who escapes by car. Atlas chases him, and even though he is severely damaged by missiles from the car, manages to catch him and run him off the road, apparently killing Walpurgis. Atlas returns to the lab and uses Walpurgis' equipment to begin rebuilding his body.
-	1	"The Birth of Astro Boy"	-	May 7, 1982
Combines parts of episodes 1 and 2.
3	2	"The Robot Circus" / "Robot Circus" "ROBOTTOSAAKASU" (Japanese: ロボットサーカス)	October 15, 1980	May 14, 1982
Toby is enslaved by a robot circus owner and is forced into manual labor, but befriends a young circus worker named Kathy. When Boynton's associate, Professor Elefun, comes to fetch him but the ringmaster refuses to surrender him, Kathy does the best she can to save the boy robot. It is during this episode that Toby receives his new name, "Astro Boy", and his characteristic red boots.
4	3	"Saving our Classmate" / "Save the Classmate" "Watashitachi no Dōkyūsei o Hozon" (Japanese: 私たちの同級生を保存)	October 22, 1980	May 21, 1982
Rescued from the circus by Dr. Elefun, Astro Boy struggles with the bullying from classmates for being a robot.
5	4	"Atom vs. Atlas 2: The Resurrection of Atlas" / "Atlas Lives Again" "ATOMU tai ATORASU 2: ATORASU fukkatsu" (Japanese: アトム対アトラス・2 アトラス復活)	October 29, 1980	May 28, 1982
In Astro's second encounter with Atlas, he stops Atlas's scheme of enslaving humanity by a series of technological thefts, one of which involves the proposed robotic mother and father for Astro. Note: This episode's title does not make sense in the context of the English dub as Atlas had not made an appearance in the series yet due to the combining of episodes 1 and 2. Astro's encounter with Atlas also doesn't make sense as Astro recalls the fight they had on the iceberg, refers to Atlas by name and recognises him despite having not been shown meeting. There is also no proper explanation for Atlas' change in appearance in the flashbacks and the present time. It could be argued that the events of Astro vs Atlas that were cut out still happened, albeit off screen.
6	5	"Robot Island" / "Robot Land" "ROBOTTORANDO" (Japanese: ロボットランド)	November 5, 1980	June 4, 1982
Astro Boy and Dr. Elefun are led to a animatronic fairytale theme park when a escaped swan/princess crash lands in their yard and tells them of their abusive indentured plight.
7	6	"Frankenstein" / "Frankenstein" "FURANKENSHUTAIN" (Japanese: フランケンシュタイン)	November 12, 1980	June 11, 1982
The premature activation of a powerful Frankenstein robot is further exacerbated when Skunk convinces the robot to aid in his crime spree. The robotic crime wave leads to the deactivation of almost all robots in the city and briefly, even Astroboy.
8	7	"Red Cat" / "The Red Cat" "akai NEKO" (Japanese: 赤いネコ)	November 19, 1980	June 18, 1982
A red cat becomes the only clue to the mystery of disappearing children whose parents are involved in the development of the city's last natural and undeveloped area.
9	8	"Atom vs. Atlas 3: Crystal of the Desert" / "The Crystal of the Desert" "ATOMU tai ATORASU 3: sabaku no KURISUTARU" (Japanese: アトム対アトラス・3 砂漠のクリスタル)	November 26, 1980	June 25, 1982
While exploring the desertification of a forest, Astro Boy confronts Atlas for being cause but more so his crystal spaceship.
10	9	"The Vehicle, White Planet" / "The White Planet" "shiroi wakusei gō" (Japanese: 白い惑星号)	December 3, 1980	July 2, 1982
Astro Boy and Dr. Elefun aid a championship racer whose vehicle, the white planet, was destroyed as part of Skunk's plan to win a global race.
11	10	"Rag the Robot President" / "A Robot President" "ROBOTTO daitōryō" (Japanese: ロボット大統領)	December 10, 1980	July 9, 1982
Astro Boy and Daddy Walrus are invited to the inauguration of the first robot president and are caught up in the opposition party's plan to stop the ceremony.
12	11	"Damdam's Neck" / "Goliath's Head" "DAMUDAMU no kubi" (Japanese: ダムダムの首)	December 17, 1980	July 16, 1982
A spacecraft crashes to the earth and a robot staggers burning from the wreck. Doctor Elefun contacts Astro, who rescues Goliath from the flames. Goliath is a mining robot from Mars, with his eyes on his chest. His head contains a neutron beam. Elefun has it removed for safety, but it is stolen. Goliath leaves and goes looking for his head, removing and trying on several other robot's heads. Daddy Walrus also searches for the head, discovering it being sold at a criminal auction. Skunk Kazi gasses the crowd and takes the head. he offers to return it to Skunk if he will destroy Astro. However, a tank with the head mounted on it fires on them while they fight and they are buried under rock. Walrus (as Sam Bannister) shoots it out with the criminals at their hideout, but Skunk gets into the tank and uses the neutron beam on the police. Astro dodges the beam and wrecks the tank and Walrus knocks out Skunk. Astro returns the head to Goliath, but the two fight for the head and the beam discharges, annihilating Goliath.
13	12	"Denkou the Invisible Robot" / "The Light Ray Robot" "denkou ningen" (Japanese: 電光人間)	December 24, 1980	July 23, 1982
Skunk kidnaps and corrupts a robot capable of invisibility.
14	13	"Tomboy Uran" / "Uran the Tomboy" "URAN wa otenba musume" (Japanese: ウランはおてんば娘)	January 7, 1981	July 30, 1982
In a New Year's celebration, Dr. Elelfun presents Astro's family a younger robot sister Uran. Uran's naïve and precocious demeanor gets her involved with a Pied Piper villain who kidnaps robot children in slavery.
15	14	"Robio and Robiet" / "Robio & Robiette" "ROBIO to ROBIETTO" (Japanese: ロビオとロビエット)	January 14, 1981	August 6, 1982
Astro Boy gets involved in a rivalry of scientists who used their robotic creations to one up one another; however, the two robots from the competing camps fall in love.
16	15	"Adventure on Mars" / "Astro Fights Aliens" "kasei taichō" (Japanese: 火星隊長)	January 21, 1981	August 13, 1982
Astro captains the Second Expedition to Mars, eventually fighting hostile aliens.
17	16	"SOS on the Space Shuttle" / "Save the Carolina 3" "SUPEESUSHATORU SOS" (Japanese: スペースシャトルSOS)	January 28, 1981	August 20, 1982
Astro Boy gets involved in Skunk's outer space pirating attempt when a classmate is kidnapped.
18	17	"Atom vs. Atlas IV: The Menacing Comet" / "The Rainbow Comet" "ATOMU tai ATORASU 4: kyoufu no sui hoshi" (Japanese: アトム対アトラス・4 恐怖のすい星)	February 4, 1981	August 27, 1982
Astro Boy and classmates are kidnapped by Atlas on school field trip to a comet.
19	18	"The Devil's Balloon" / "The Death Balloon" "akuma no fūsen" (Japanese: 悪魔の風船)	February 11, 1981	September 3, 1982
Astro untangles the mystery of balloons modeled after him as they attack the city, and everyone (except Astro's family, Dr. Elefun, and classmates Mindy, Theodore, and Kenneth) thinks Astro is responsible for the making of these balloons.
20	19	"Pook in Cruciform Island" / "The Transformation Robot" "jūjika shima no PUUKU" (Japanese: 十字架島のプーク)	February 18, 1981	September 10, 1982
Astro Boy visits a robot inhabited island where gangsters attempt loot uranium resources by enlisting the help of a robot who can transform into any shape.
21	20	"Ivan the Fool" / "The Wreck of the Titan" "IWAN no BAKA" (Japanese: イワンのバカ)	February 25, 1981	September 17, 1982
The luxury spaceliner Titan is struck by an asteroid. Astro and several others are the last to escape before it explodes. Their lifeboat malfunctions, but they are able to land on the moon, in a crater with an atmosphere. Astro discovers the wreck of a Russian spacecraft from 1990 whose female pilot survived for thirty years, building a robot, Ivan and discovering several large diamonds. The diamonds are meaningless until rescue, when one of the passengers, a ruthless man (Boon Marukubi), decides to take the diamonds. He finds them, but gets left behind. Ivan takes care of him.
22	21	"The Robot Who Lied" / "The Liar Robot" "usotsuki ROBOTTO" (Japanese: うそつきロボット)	March 4, 1981	September 24, 1982
A school field trip to a seismology department is interrupted by a robot constantly lying about a impending earthquake.
23	22	"The Girl from Alsore" / "The Girl from Alsoar" "ARUSOA kara kita shōjo" (Japanese: アルソアから来た少女)	March 11, 1981	October 1, 1982
Astro Boy and mysterious alien woman work together to stop an hostile alien invasion.
24	23	"The Biggest Robot on Earth Part 1" / "The Greatest Robot in the World (Part 1)" "chijōsaidai no ROBOTTO zenpen" (Japanese: 地上最大のロボット・前編)	March 18, 1981	October 8, 1982
A power-hungry Sultan commissions a powerful fighting robot named Pluto (Bruton in the dubs) with 1 million horse power, and sends him to battle 7 of the world's strongest robots: Mont Blanc, Molnar, Brondo, Zeron, Hercules, Photar, and Astro. Bruton manages to easily destroy Mont Blanc by catching him off guard. When he heads to battle Astro, he instead is met by Uran, who tells him Astro won't fight him. Bruton takes Uran hostage to lure Astro into a fight, and goes and destroys Molnar. When Astro catches up to Bruton, the robot wrestler Brondo appears, looking to avenge the death of his friend, Molnar. Bruton returns Uran to Astro, and takes on Brondo; however, he is heavily damaged in the fight. He begs for Astro to activate his summoning beacon to call his master; Astro does so, earning Bruton's gratitude. Later, Astro is contacted by Zeron, who has a warrant for Bruton's arrest. Soon after, Zeron is challenged by Bruton, and nearly gains the upper hand until Bruton rips his body in two. Soon, Dr. Elefun locates the Sultan's palace and flies there, with Astro tailing him. The Sultan holds Dr. Elefun hostage, as a bargaining chip to make Astro fight Bruton. Bruton returns to the palace and encounters Astro, and the two battle until Bruton catches Astro in his hands, and threatens to tear him apart.
25	24	"The Biggest Robot on Earth Part 2" / "The Greatest Robot in the World (Part 2)" "chijōsaidai no ROBOTTO kōhen" (Japanese: 地上最大のロボット・後編)	March 25, 1981	October 15, 1982
Bruton releases Astro, as thanks for helping him before. Astro begs him to reconsider having to fight, but Bruton explains that he cannot, as that was his primary purpose. Bruton goes off to battle Hercules, a powerful Greek Spartan robot. Bruton successfully destroys him, then goes on to battle Photar, a kind, compassionate robot who takes care of orphans. Photar begs Bruton for the chance to say goodbye to his orphans, which he grants. Later, they battle in a terrible storm; as Photar is a solar powered robot, he runs out of energy and is destroyed. The Sultan calls out Astro once again, and has him battle Bruton at a volcanic valley. However, the volcano threatens to erupt and destroy all of the nearby villages and towns unless the power is contained. Astro begins throwing boulders into the volcanic vent to contain the power and begs Bruton for assistance. Bruton initially refuses, but finally has a change of heart and begins assisting Astro, much to the chagrin of the Sultan and the delight of Elefun. The two successfully stop the volcano from erupting, and Astro commends Bruton for his help and tells him that he is a good robot after all. Their victory is cut short, however, when Sultan's scientist, Dr. Abraham, reveals his own secret creation: a super robot named Bora, with a 2 million horsepower engine, and enough destructive force to knock out other robots simply by yelling its name and creating a katabatic wind. Bruton asks Astro to give his regards to Uran, and sacrifices himself to attempt to destroy Bora. However, Bora survives this attempt with nary a scratch, forcing Astro to fight it. He manages to destroy Bora by getting it to attack itself, and getting inside its damaged body and blasting its innards. As Sultan mourns the loss of Bruton, Abraham reveals himself to be a robot; he was Sultan's robotic assistant, and created Bora to prove that brute force alone isn't everything. Astro and Elefun mourn the loss of Bruton, as well as Mont Blanc, Molnar, Brondo, Zeron, Hercules, and Photar, and hope that a future will come where all of man, and all of robots, can live together in peace.
26	25	"Atom vs. Atlas 5: The Violent Gang Gadem" / "The Robot Vikings" "ATOMU tai ATORASU 5: bōsōzoku GADEMU" (Japanese: アトム対アトラス・5 暴走族ガデム)	April 1, 1981	October 22, 1982
A wild gang of robots rampage through the city, causing havoc and destruction. Meanwhile, Uran is trying to teach Jump how to do tricks, but gets upset when Jump can't perform one of her tricks. Astro explains that Jump isn't the same as a robot, and Uran becomes upset and keeps Jump out of the house. When she finally relents and lets Jump back in from the rain, she gets angry when he shakes himself off all over her toys. Astro scolds her and tells her of the history between him and Jump. That night, the robot gang attacks Astro's house, grabbing Jump and throwing him into a high rise building. The next morning, Astro discovers the footprints from the robot gang in the yard, and Astro's father tells them that the papers reported on the incident, calling the gang "Robot Vikings". Just then, a neighbor comes to the house, bringing a badly injured Jump with her, frightening Uran and Astro. Determined to confront the Robot Vikings for their crimes, Astro wants to head off to find them, but is stopped by his mother, who tells him that Dr. Elefun is not in town to give his consent to fight. Astro's father hires a temporary robot watchdog, and that night, when the Robot Vikings return, it manages to take out several gang members before getting destroyed. Astro intervenes and damages another member, until the entire gang retreats at the sight of a press helicopter. The police inspector calls Astro the next morning and demands he stay in his home. Disguising himself as a dog, Astro sneaks out to search for the Robot Vikings. When he encounters them, he surprises them all by easily besting them in combat, but they attempt to gain the upper hand and combining themselves into a centipede-like tank robot; Astro manages to trounce them. In a last ditch effort, the leader tries spraying Astro with an adhesive, but Astro manages to drag the entire gang across town and electrocute them, but the gang escapes. Later, Astro phones Uran but is scolded instead by his father, who tells him that Uran is at the vet watching over Jump; she felt remorse for her previous treatment of Jump and does not want to see him die. Tracking the Robot Vikings to a cavern, Astro is shocked to find Livian, Atlas's assistant, encased in a glass coffin. The Robot Viking leader attempts to kill Astro by flooding the cavern with lava, but Astro escapes with Livian, while the Robot Vikings die in the lava. Astro encounters Atlas, who is grateful that he saved Livian, and explains that the Robot Vikings were once his soldiers, but were given the Omega Factor, causing them to rebel. Astro berates him for using the Omega Factor so blindly, but Atlas brushes it off, wishing to repay Astro for his help. Astro asks him to make a medicine to help Jump; although puzzled, Atlas complies and delivers the serum to the vet. Jump recovers from his injuries and returns home to Astro and Uran, who now appreciate his presence more than ever.
27	26	"Black Jack's Great Strategy" / "The Time Machine" "BURAKKUJAKKU no daisakusen" (Japanese: ブラックジャックの大作戦)	April 8, 1981	October 29, 1982
Uran is watering a growing tulip when a time travel machine arrives from two centuries in the future, crushing down on her tulip. Rock, a time traveling detective, merges from the machine and announces that he is searching for Astro to participate on his adventure, and soon takes him and Uran in the machine, which then travels to the then-present day where the infamous surgeon, Black Jack and his assistant Pinoko are awaiting breakfast. Rock is also picking up Black Jack on his journey, and soon reveals that he is taking him and Astro to 15th century Silverland in order to save the life of Prince Sapphire, who, in a twist of irony, was injured from an earlier excursion to the past by the time traveller; at the same time, Rock was also tracking down a rogue fugitive from another time – Gor, an evil sorcerer who is plotting to usurp the throne from Sapphire and conquer all of Silverland with an army of monsters to do his bidding. The time machine arrives at the kingdom, where Astro recently stops a march of mutated monsters attacking the guard. With the client under his disposal, Black Jack insists that he be isolated and will not operate until he is offered the key to the treasury vault. Midday through his progress, Black Jack discovers that the Prince was actually a princess all along. No sooner did Gor returned to the castle to seize the throne room that he saw Black Jack finishing his client. After the doctor reveals the truth that he kept his word but would not operate on the princess, Astro goes into battle with the sorcerer's monsters for one final conflict. Rock, who had disguised himself as Black Jack, finally captures and unmask the villain, who turns out to be Osamu Tezuka messing up his own mythology. Black Jack, after a worthwhile operation intent on reviving Sapphire, with his acknowledgement, lets her expose the truth of her secret life to her kingdom.
28	27	"The Great Adventure of Little Robot Sam" / "The Robot Stuntman" "chibi ROBOSAMU no daibōken" (Japanese: ちびロボサムの大冒険)	April 29, 1981	November 5, 1982
Uran goes on a tour of a Hollywood studio and meets Tom Stanton. During the visit Uran discovers a stunt robot named Sam being kept in a little box. Uran releases Sam, revealing the studios secrets.
29	28	"Atom vs. Atlas 6: The King of the Ice" / "The Great Meltdown" "ATOMU tai ATORASU 6: koori no naka no teiō" (Japanese: アトム対アトラス・6 氷の中の帝王)	May 6, 1981	November 12, 1982
Livian crashes in front of Astro with memory damage. After being examined by Dr. Elephun, Livian reveals the arctic icebergs are melting. Astro must have a showdown with Atlas to save Earth.
30	29	"Uran and Uran" / "Uran's Twin" "URAN-chan to URAN-chan" (Japanese: ウランちゃんとウランちゃん)	May 13, 1981	November 19, 1982
Wanting to watch robot wrestling instead of practice piano, Uran makes a twin of herself. Eventually Uran gets drawn into competing in the robot wrestling matches. This episode has an Easter egg referencing the original Gundam. It can be seen as Uran walks past a playground on her way to class.
31	30	"Dash in a Storm!" / "Speeding Through the Storm" "arashi no naka wo tsuppashire!" (Japanese: 嵐の中を突っ走れ!)	June 3, 1981	November 26, 1982
During a class field trip, an old damn threatens to burst due to a violent storm.
32	31	"Cleopatra's Mystery" / "The Return of Queen Cleopatra" "KUREOPATORA no nazo" (Japanese: クレオパトラの謎)	June 17, 1981	December 3, 1982
Astro gets caught up in a conflict between Cleopatra and Julius Caesar.
33	32	"Atom vs. Atlas 7: The Runaway Marine Express" / "The Runaway Subway Train" "ATOMU tai ATORASU 7 chikatetsu daibōsō" (Japanese: アトム対アトラス・7 地下鉄大暴走)	July 1, 1981	December 10, 1982
Atlus forces Astro into a fight by causing the new high-speed subway to run out of control.
34	33	"The Little Elephant Pete" / "The Baby Elephant Pook" "kozō PUURA" (Japanese: 子象プーラ)	July 8, 1981	December 17, 1982
After a real elephant is killed in a robot safari park, Astro must protect the orphaned baby elephant from the killer robot Zohra.
35	34	"The Secret of Wasp Island" / "The Secret of Bee City" "MITSUBACHI shima no himitsu" (Japanese: ミツバチ島の秘密)	July 15, 1981	December 24, 1982
During a pleasure cruise to Bee Island, Uran and Astro are dragged into a mystery involving the search for a long lost scientist and a city where bees rule over human slaves.
36	35	"The Monster of Clockwork" / "The Monster of Clarken" "KURAAKEN no kaibutsu" (Japanese: クラーケンの怪物)	July 22, 1981	December 31, 1982
Astro attempts to save the Golden Coral Forest from various dangers.
37	36	"Lila in Parable Island" / "Lilly on Peligro Island" "POCHOMUPOCCHO shima no RUMII" (Japanese: ポチョムポチョム島のルミ)	August 5, 1981	January 7, 1983
Astro finds a series of notes from a girl named Lily, who claims to be a hostage on the island of Peligro.
38	37	"Atom vs. Atlas 8: Destruction of the Satellite! The Proton Gun" / "The Anti-Proton Gun" "ATOMU tai ATORASU 8: eisei hakai! PUROTON hou" (Japanese: アトム対アトラス・8 衛星破壊!プロトン砲)	August 19, 1981	January 14, 1983
Astro travels to space to prevent the most powerful gun in the world from falling into the hands of Atlas and Walpur Guiss.
39	38	"The Artificial Sun" / "The Man-Made Solar Sphere" "nusumareta taiyō" (Japanese: 盗まれた太陽)	September 2, 1981	January 21, 1983
Detective Randolph Holmes joins Dr. Elephun and Astro to discover the whereabouts of a powerful device known as the solar sphere.
40	39	"Black Looks" / "Blackie Young" "BURAKKURUKKUSU" (Japanese: ブラックルックス)	September 16, 1981	January 28, 1983
Dr. Elephun discovers the remains of a myserious robot. After rebuilding what he can, Dr. Elphun and Astro discover myserious clues leading to the South Pole and a gang who proclaim themselves the enemies of all robots.
41	40	"The Devil Garon" / "The Genie from Outer Space" "majin GARON" (Japanese: 魔神ガロン)	September 23, 1981	February 4, 1983
One evening, Astro is watching a story on TV about a boy who finds a bottle that contains a genie, who is released and promptly threatens to eat the boy. The boy instead asks to see if the genie can drink all the water in the sea; the genie grants his wish and drinks so much water that he explodes. As the story ends, a large meteor falls into a mountain valley some distance away. Dr. Elefun, Astro, and a team of scientists head off to investigate the crash. At the impact site, Astro uncovers a large metallic meteor-like object that turns out to be a mass of metal parts. Astro constructs the parts, and finds that they form a giant robot. A message capsule hidden in the mass calls the robot "Garon", which came from an alien planet and apparently has xenoforming abilities. That night, a thunderstorm erupts, and Garon is brought to life by a stray bolt of lightning, frightening the scientists. Astro subdues Garon before he can cause damage, trapping him back in the impact site and buried in molten lava. However, one of the scientists, Dr. Adams, later uncovers Garon and secretly smuggles him to a remote island in the South Pacific. There, he requests Garon xenoform the island to resemble the planet of his origin. As Garon proceeds to xenoform the island, he also alters the atmosphere around the island to that of his planet. The scientists discover that his atmosphere has almost no oxygen content, but all perish before they can escape. The tradewinds begin carrying the poisonous atmosphere across the South Pacific, killing all life in its way. Astro is sent by Elefun to investigate, and he encounters Garon, still busily xenoforming the island. Realizing that he can't win by brute force alone, he tricks Garon into also altering the gravity of the island to match that of his planet for at least one minute. Garon falls for his trick, and after altering the gravity of the island, gets shot back out into outer space, creating a vacuum around the island that pulls all of the poisonous gas along with him.
42	41	"Hurry! You Three Second-Rate Knights!" / "The Robots Nobody Wanted" "susume! GARAKUTA sanjūshi!" (Japanese: 進め!ガラクタ三銃士!)	October 14, 1981	February 11, 1983
43	42	"Atom vs. Atlas 9: Remember Atlas" / "Atlas Forever" "ATOMU tai ATORASU 9: ATORASU yo eien ni" (Japanese: アトム対アトラス・9 アトラスよ永遠に)	October 21, 1981	February 18, 1983
Alien invaders arrive in the Sol system and begin destroying space stations orbiting several of the planets. The nations of the world believe the attacks are those of Atlas, and unite to form a World Defense Force to stop Atlas. Captain Keeley, one of the squad leaders, is tasked to destroy Atlas, which he desires as revenge for the death of his brother, a scientist on one of the destroyed stations. Astro, however, wishes to reason with Atlas, but Keeley refuses and takes his squadron out to battle. Atlas arrives to battle Keeley's squadron, and when Astro confronts him about the attacks, Atlas claims he never attacked the stations; he had come because he had heard the humans were seeking him out. He instead decides to battle Astro instead, but Livian, who was watching their encounter, begs Astro not to fight Atlas, as the two are actually brothers; Atlas and Astro were born of the same template. Astro is shocked, and Atlas goads him into joining him, knowing the truth, but Astro can't bring himself to do so. Astro has a flashback of all of their previous encounters, and he begs Atlas to make the right choice. Keeley finds Astro, and reveals his key weapon: a laser that can damage Atlas's Omega Factor. Astro rushes to find Atlas to warn him about Keeley, but Atlas refuses to run; Keeley finds Atlas and shoots him with the laser, despite Astro's begging him not to. The invaders reveal themselves, and destroy most of Keeley's squadron. Back on Earth, Dr. Elefun studies the footage of the invaders, deducing that Atlas was telling the truth. Astro tells him that he and Atlas are brothers; Dr. Elefun recalls the theft of Astro's plans and realizes Astro is correct. Meanwhile, the WDF calls an emergency meeting to strategize a plan on stopping the invaders, who are heading straight for Earth. Keeley's squadron rush back to Earth, and Astro rushes to the rescue of many civilians until he collapses from energy exhaustion. He is found and brought to an emergency shelter with Elefun. Keeley contacts him and tells him that an invader squadron is coming from Saturn, and he confesses he was wrong about Atlas. Astro swears that he will protect all those that he knows and loves, and rushes to find Atlas to reason with him again. He gets ambushed by invaders, but Atlas finds him. Astro begs Atlas to help the humans fight the invaders, but Atlas stubbornly refuses, claiming he hopes all of the humans die. Astro rebuffs him by saying that not all humans are bad, and that many are good and kind, and see past Astro being a robot. Livian reasons with Atlas, saying that Astro fights out of love and not out of hatred, but Atlas thinks he is foolish. He tells Astro to tell the humans "Perish!", but Livian shows Atlas the battle between Keeley's squadron and the invaders. Keeley sacrifices himself to destroy several invaders, and Atlas joins the fray, destroying many more invaders. They find the invader's base, and Atlas warns Astro not to join, and tells him that they are truly brothers after all. Livian stays with Atlas, out of love, and the two give their lives to pull the entire base and the invader squadron out into deep space. Astro is heartbroken by his brother's sacrifice.
44	43	"The Magical Ice Leopard" / "The Snow Leopard" "uchū HYOU" (Japanese: 宇宙ヒョウ)	October 28, 1981	February 25, 1983
A strange snow begins to fall. The snow drains energy from everything it touches. Astro battles a leopard, which is controlled by a strange doctor, who wants control of all the energy in the city.
45	44	"Uran's God" / "Uran's Quest" "URAN-chan no kamisama" (Japanese: ウランちゃんの神様)	November 4, 1981	March 4, 1983
46	45	"Space Airport R45" / "Outer Spaceport R-45" "uchū kūkō R-45" (Japanese: 宇宙空港R-45)	November 11, 1981	March 11, 1983
47	46	"Spaceship in Imminent Danger!" / "The Hijacked Airship" "hikōsen kikīppatsu!" (Japanese: 飛行船 危機一髪!)	November 18, 1981	March 18, 1983
48	47	"Boulder of a Human-Face" / "The Human-Faced Rock" "jinmen'iwa" (Japanese: 人面岩)	November 25, 1981	March 25, 1983
49	48	"Drake's Revenge" / "Uran Falls in Love" "URAN wa koroshiya ga suki" (Japanese: ウランは殺し屋が好き)	December 2, 1981	April 1, 1983
50	49	"The Devil's Place in Ordin" / "The World of Odin" "OUDIN no daimakyō" (Japanese: オーディンの大魔境)	December 9, 1981	April 8, 1983
Astro, Dr. Elefun and some modern-day vikings search for the lost tomb of Odin, but don't quite find what they are expecting.
51	50	"Rage of the Sphinx" / "The Secret of the Mayas" "SUFUINKUSU no ikari" (Japanese: スフインクスの怒り)	December 16, 1981	April 15, 1983
52	51	"Atom and Nuka" / "Astro's First Love" "ATOMU no hatsukoi" (Japanese: アトムの初恋)	December 23, 1981	April 22, 1983
In a prologue, Astro Boy's creator Osamu Tezuka reveals a little secret about the robot boy: That his legs are actually those of a robot girl. The backstory behind this fact, the plot of this episode, is that Astro Boy is tasked to retrieve one of his own blueprint templates from a military fortress of the Grota Republic. He meets and bonds with Nuka (Nikki in the American dub), a sentient robot girl built from his very template, which unfortunately incorporates a neutron bomb, and in order to stop the bomb, the two robot children have to make a costly sacrifice: she must be completely dismantled in order to stop the bomb. Astro, having fallen in love with Nikki, stays with her till the very end. All that is left of her are her legs, which Astro takes to Dr. Elefun and asks him to switch his legs with hers, so that she could be a part of him forever. Elefun fulfills his request, and Astro happily takes off on more adventures.
