= Mari Shimizu =

Japanese voice actress (born 1936)

- 清水マリ
- Born: June 7, 1936 (age 90); Urawa, Saitama, Empire of Japan
- Occupation: Voice actress
- Years active: 1963–present
- Employer: 81 Produce
- Notable work: Astro Boy as Astro Boy; Humanoid Monster Bem as Belo; Jetter Mars as Jetter Mars

Mari Shimizu (Japanese: 清水 マリ, Hepburn: Shimizu Mari; born June 7, 1936) is a Japanese voice actress affiliated with 81 Produce. She is known for voicing the titular protagonist of the 1963 Astro Boy television series and its 1980 colour remake, Belo in Humanoid Monster Bem, and the titular protagonist of Jetter Mars.

== Biography ==
=== Early life ===
Shimizu, the daughter of actor Gen Shimizu and a Mitsukoshi seamstress, was born on June 7, 1936 in Motobuto, an area in Urawa-ku, Saitama. During World War II, her family lived in poverty. Shimizu was educated at Urawa Nishi High School, where she was part of their theater club, and afterwards the Haiyuza Theatre Company's school.

Originally, she was a pitcher for her junior high school's softball team. However, when her father's theater troupe had no child actors to play the titular character of their stage adaptation of The Adventures of Pinocchio, Shimizu was selected for the role, inspiring her to become an actor. She graduated from the actor's training school of Haiyuza Theater company with Kumi Mizuno and later became part of Gekidan Shinjinkai. In addition to working as an actress, Shimizu worked as actress Misako Watanabe's apprentice and as a production assistant.

=== Astro Boy ===
In 1962, Osamu Tezuka introduced Shimizu to his manga series, Astro Boy, after Kaoru Anami, a childhood acquaintance of Shimizu's and future Mushi Production executive, recommended her to Tezuka due to a conversation in which they noted Pinocchio's inspiration of Astro Boy and Shimizu's previous role as Pinocchio. Although she had not read manga and was even unaware of Astro Boy's existence, she was later cast as the titular character in the anime's original pilot episode and the subsequent anime series. During production, she became pregnant, and after a doctor advised against working during her pregnancy, she took an eight-episode break from the role with Kazue Tagami as her substitute, resulting in several children complaining to the show's broadcasting network, Fuji TV.

Tezuka originally wanted Atom's voice actress to remain unchanged, and Shimizu reprised her role as Astro Boy in the show's 1980 colour remake and in the 2000 film The Last Mystery of the 20th Century. However, Tezuka died in 1989, and on April 6, 2003, she retired from voicing Astro Boy, later saying in a 2013 interview with Seiyū Grand Prix that she wanted a younger voice actor to succeed her.

=== Later career and life ===
In 1968, Shimizu starred in Humanoid Monster Bem as Belo, a character she later recalled struggling with by having to convey "a dark image because he was a child crawling under the ground". In 1977, Shimizu was cast as the titular character of Jetter Mars; she later recalled that during the series' production, she felt a lack of patience over voicing the only child character and rising tensions. In 1978, she voiced Jim Hawkins in Treasure Island, later recalling that the character "left an impression on [her]". Other characters Shimizu voiced include Mame-tan in Detective Brat Pack, Kanbō in Sabu to Ichi Torimono Hikae, Tomiko Shimamoto in Attack No. 1, Ken in Hitori Bocchi, Inspy in Marine Boy, Tetsuji in Ikkyū-san, Gorō Makino in Uchu Enban Daisenso, Mirun in Gaiking, Kira in Galaxy Express 999, Yusuf in Animation Kikō: Marco Polo no Bōken, Patty in Triton of the Sea, Adam in Undersea Super Train: Marine Express, Prince Alor in Beast King GoLion, Peko in Doraemon: Nobita and the Haunts of Evil, Tezuka's mother in The Tezuka Osamu Story: I Am Son-goku, and Ricky in the 2004–2006 anime adaptation of Black Jack.

Shimizu wanted to focus on Shinjinkai after Astro Boy's final episode, but she had a child while the series was still airing, making it difficult to participate in stage acting, and moved to the same office as Nobuyo Ōyama, who was her friend from the Haiyuza school. Shimizu later worked for Aoni Production and Production Baobab, before moving to 81 Produce.

Shimizu is nicknamed as the "Mother of Voice Actors" (声優の母, Seiyū no haha). In 2006, she won a Special Achievement Award at the 5th Tokyo International Anime Fair. She was one of the three winners of the Synergy Award at the 3rd Seiyu Awards in 2009. In 2017, she won the Merit Award at the 11th Seiyu Awards. She was a guest at the 2016 Nara International Film Festival's Astro Boy screening and at the 2023 Grand Rapids Comic-Con. She has also served as the secretary of Urawa Nishi High School's alumni association.

In 2015, Shimizu's autobiography, Tetsuwan atomu to tomo ni ikite: seiyū ga kataru anime no sekai (鉄腕アトムと共に生きて－声優が語るアニメの世界, lit. "Living With Astro Boy: The Anime World As Told By A Voice Actor"), was published by Sakitama Publishing. Shimizu said that she wrote the book because she "wanted to leave her past that way".

Shimizu later became a voice acting teacher, teaching at the Institute of Sound Arts.

== Filmography ==
=== Television ===
- Astro Boy (1963) – Astro Boy (Eps. 1-96, 107-193)
- The Jetsons (1963) – Elroy Jetson (Eps. 1–24)
- The Lucy Show (1963-1966) – Jerry Carmichael (Dubbed)
- Wanpaku Tanteidan (1968) – Mame-tan (Eps. 2-35)
- Sabu to Ichi Torimono Hikae (1968) – Kanbō (Ep. 8)
- Humanoid Monster Bem (1968) – Bero (1-26, part 1 Pilot 1-2)
- Marine Boy (1969) – Inspy (Ep. 15)
- Attack No. 1 (1969) – Tomiko Shimamoto (1- ?)
- Triton of the Sea (1972) – Patty (Ep. 22)
- Ikkyū-san (1975) – Tessai (1-?)
- Gaiking (1976) – Mirun (Ep. 38)
- Jetter Mars (1977) – Jetter Mars (Eps. 1-27)
- Galaxy Express 999 (1978) – Kira (Ep. 43)
- Treasure Island (1978) – Jim Hawkins (Eps. 1-26)
- Animation Kikō: Marco Polo no Bōken (1979) – Yusuf (Ep. 18)
- Undersea Super Train: Marine Express (1979) – Adam Nasenkopf
- Astro Boy (1980) – Astro Boy (Eps. 1-52)
- Beast King GoLion (1981) – Prince Alon(Eps. 1-52)
- Black Jack (2004) – Ricky (Karte 30)

=== Film ===
- Peter Pan (1963 Japanese dub) – Peter Pan
- Hitori Bocchi (1969) – Ken
- Uchu Enban Daisenso (1975) – Gorō Makino
- Doraemon: Nobita and the Haunts of Evil (1982) – Peko/Prince Kuntak
- The Tezuka Osamu Story: I Am Son-goku (1989) – Tezuka's mother
- The Last Mystery of the 20th Century (2000) – Astro Boy
