= Uchu Enban Daisenso =

1975 film

- LP album of the film.

宇宙円盤大戦争 (Uchū Enban Daisensō)
- Anime film
- Directed by: Yūgo Serikawa
- Produced by: Chiaki Imada
- Written by: Shozo Uehara
- Music by: Shunsuke Kikuchi
- Studio: Toei Doga
- Released: 26 July 1975
- Runtime: 30 minutes
- Manga
- Written by: Go Nagai
- Illustrated by: Megumu Matsumoto
- Published by: Kodansha
- Magazine: TV Magazine
- Original run: July 1975 – August 1975
- Volumes: 1
- Manga
- Written by: Go Nagai
- Illustrated by: Yoshimitsu Shintaku
- Published by: Akita Shoten
- Magazine: Boken-O
- Published: Summer 1975
- Volumes: 1

Uchu Enban Daisenso (宇宙円盤大戦争, Uchū Enban Daisensō; "Battlefield of The Space Saucers") is a 1975 Japanese animated short film created by Go Nagai and produced by Toei Doga. It was originally shown along with the short film Great Mazinger tai Getter Robot G: Kuchu Daigekitotsu, also from Toei and Nagai. The film is considered the prototype for the future anime television series UFO Robot Grendizer, which premiered the same year.

== Yaban Forces ==
The Yaban forces originate from a planet of the same name and primarily consist of green compact saucers that fire orange lasers, bladed discs, chains, and can morph into wingless dragons or tanks, blue saucers that fire missiles, and the main command ship called the Quinn Byrne. After the destruction of planet Fleed, one of the last survivors, Duke Fleed, stole an experimental giant robot named Gattaiger and fled to Earth where the Yaban attacked every major city. The Yaban forces eventually confront Duke Fleed and the Gattaiger near the end of the movie. Gattaiger's powers include faster than light flight, Spider Spin (a buzzsaw mode used by the Flying Tiger), Needle Shower (needle missiles from the Flying Tiger), Space Thunder (three lasers from each side of the Flying Tiger), and Thunder Focus (combining all six beams into one). After the death of Duke's fiancé, Telonna, he leaves Earth with the Gattaiger.

== Staff ==
- Original plan/Original work: Go Nagai, Dynamic Production
- Original plan: Sacre Burn (pen name of the producers group)
- Director: Yugo Serikawa
- Scenario: Shozo Uehara
- Planning: Ken Ariga, Mineo Souda
- Producer: Chiaki Imada
- Animation director: Akira Sakano
- Assistant director: Yoichi Kominato
- Art director: Fumihiro Uchikawa
- Music: Shunsuke Kikuchi
- Theme songs lyrics: Kogo Hotomi
- Theme songs performance: Isao Sasaki
- Theme Song: "Tatakae! Uchu no Oja"
- Vice theme song: "Moeru Ai no Hoshi"
- Cast: Isao Sasaki (Duke Freed/Daisuke Umon), Noriko Ohara (Telonna), Minori Matsushima (Hikaru Makiba), Mari Shimizu (Goro Makiba), Kenji Utsumi (Blackey), Yasuo Hisamatsu (Genzo Umon)

== See also ==
- UFO Robot Grendizer
- Grendizer U: Elements from the film were integrated into this anime remake.
