= Wee Willie Webber =

Radio and TV personality

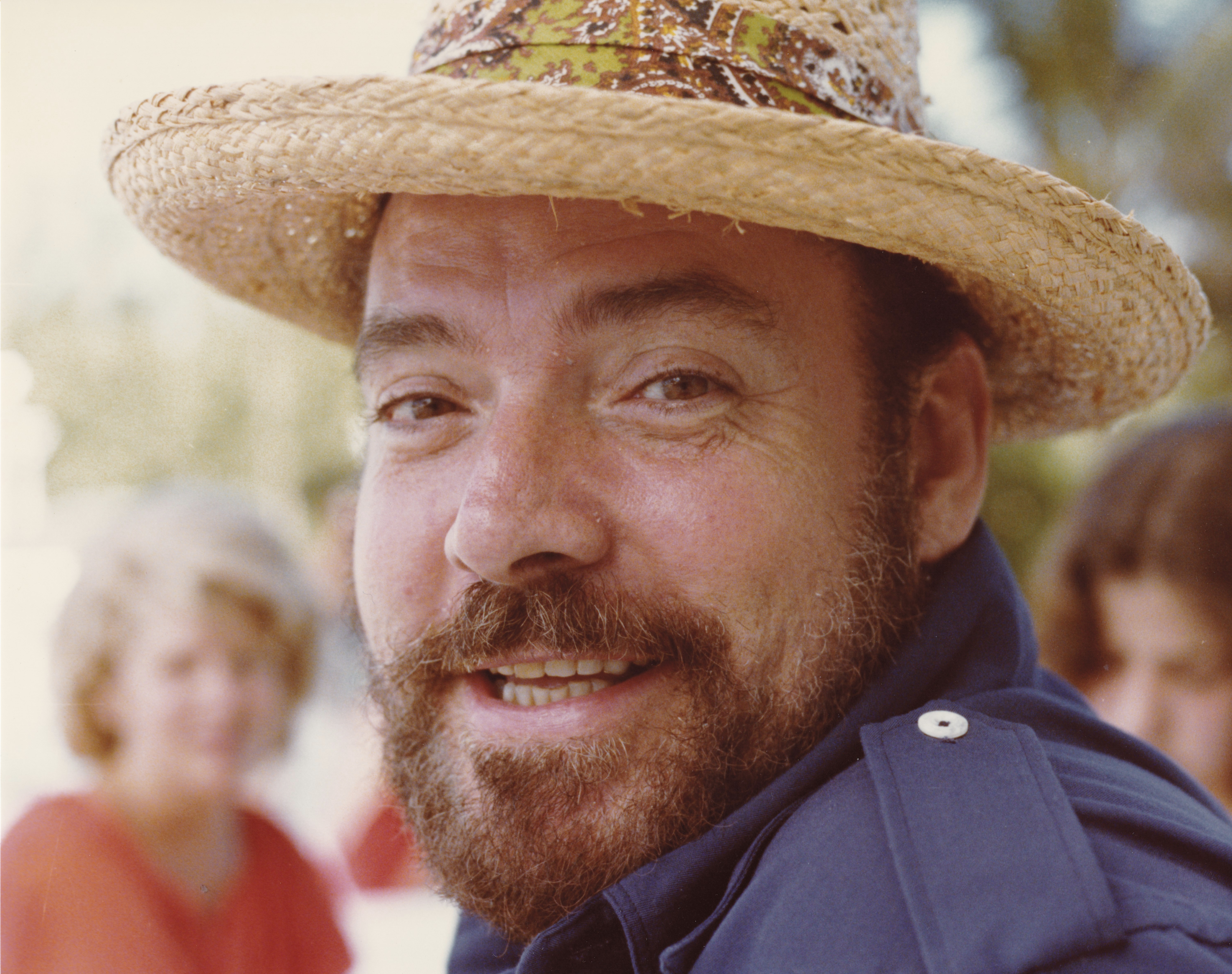
- Born: June 11, 1929; Havana, Cuba
- Died: May 23, 2010 (aged 80); Philadelphia, Pennsylvania, U.S.
- Other names: Wee Willie, Bill Webber
- Occupations: Broadcaster, Radio Personality
- Years active: 1948–2010
- Spouse: Constance Russell (m. 1958)
- Children: Bill Webber Jr. (b. 1959); Wendy Webber (b. 1963)

Bill "Wee Willie" Webber (June 11, 1929 – May 23, 2010) was an American radio and television personality and pioneer. Webber worked in radio and television in the Philadelphia, Pennsylvania, region for more than 50 years.

== Biography ==
Webber was born in Havana, Cuba. His father was British while his grandfather, an engineer, helped to pave the streets of Havana. His family immigrated to the United States, and Webber was raised in the Bushwick neighborhood of New York City. Webber graduated from Bushwick High School and attended classes at New York University.

Webber enlisted in the United States Army after World War II and worked as an Army mapmaker while stationed in Japan. He successfully auditioned for the Armed Forces Radio on Honshu, earning the nickname "Honshu Cowboy" because he played country music. His time in the Army allowed Webber to obtain U.S. citizenship.

== Broadcasting ==
Webber began his broadcasting career in 1948, at WGYN, a now-defunct FM radio station in New York City. He worked for other radio stations in New York and in Lancaster, Pennsylvania during his early adulthood.

Webber was hired as an announcer at WEEU-TV (channel 33) in Reading, Pennsylvania, in 1953. However, the station was unprofitable; it went off the air in 1955, after Webber left.

In 1954, Webber began working in Philadelphia at WFIL and WFIL-FM as a "summer relief announcer."

In 1956, Webber became an announcer at WFIL-TV (Channel 6). He began hosting Breakfast Time, a two-hour, morning children's show on Channel 6. The show, which featured cartoons, weather, and sports, aired until the 1960s. In 1963, Webber joined WRCV-TV (Channel 3) as host of a quiz show. Webber played cartoons for the kids and did news, sports, interviews, comedy bits, weather and time checks for the adults. It typically aired weekdays from 7:45 am – 9:00 am and on Saturdays from 9:00 am – 10:00 am. Breakfast Time was Philadelphia's top-rated early-morning TV show for many years.

The cartoons included Bugs Bunny, Porky Pig, Daffy Duck, Sylvester the Cat, Tweety Bird and other Looney Tunes and Merrie Melodies features. Other shows included Popeye the Sailor, The Three Stooges, Ramar of the Jungle, and Felix the Cat. Regular characters on the show included Elmo WiffleWeather (a toy clown on a unicycle who would ride down a high wire to deliver the weather) & Mr. Chix from Channel 6 (eyes drawn on Webber's chin attached to a puppet, inverted via a set of mirrors). The theme song for the show was Bugler's Holiday by Leroy Anderson.

Webber also worked at WFIL-AM and WFIL-FM radio which were co-located in the same building at 46th & Market Streets. Dick Clark was on the same TV/Radio staff. Webber was an occasional booth announcer for American Bandstand which was produced in Studio B. Breakfast Time was one of the first shows to be videotaped instead of kinescoped. Vladimir K. Zworykin crossed the Delaware River from the RCA laboratory in Camden, New Jersey to supervise an early test. One of those videotapes from January 1963 has survived and can be seen in a YouTube playlist.

However, Webber's quiz show was canceled in 1965 when Westinghouse Broadcasting acquired the station and moved production of The Mike Douglas Show to Philadelphia. In September 1965, Webber played the last song on KYW radio before the station switched to an all-news format.

He next hosted the Wee Willie Webber Colorful Cartoon Club, an after-school show which aired on WPHL-TV (Channel 17) in the late afternoon hours. The Wee Willie Webber Colorful Cartoon Club ran for 10 years, from 1965 until 1975. From 1976 to 1979, he hosted a similar show on WKBS-TV (Channel 48).

In the late 1960s, Webber became the 10 a.m. to 1 p.m air personality at WIP radio. He would remain in that time slot on WIP into the 1980s. Webber later was heard on WPEN radio from 1989 until 2005. From about 2007 until 2010, Webber hosted a weekday program on WHAT radio and a Sunday afternoon show on WVLT in Vineland, New Jersey.

Webber was inducted into the Broadcast Pioneers of Philadelphia Hall of Fame in 1999. He served as the president of the Broadcast Pioneers of Philadelphia from 2002 until 2004. From 2004 until 2006, Webber served as the chairman of the Broadcast Pioneers' board of directors. In 2006, the Broadcast Pioneers of Philadelphia named Webber its Person of the Year. In 2007, Webber again served as the organization's chairman of the board, a position he held at the time of his death in 2010.

== Death ==
Bill Webber died of a heart attack at Penn Presbyterian Medical Center in Philadelphia on May 23, 2010, at the age of 80. He was awaiting heart surgery at the time of his death. He was survived by his wife, Constance; daughter, Wendy Scheid; son, William Webber Jr.; and four grandchildren (Taylor, actor Drew Scheid, Owen, and Grace). Webber lived on Rittenhouse Square at the time.

== Television ==
Year	Station	City	Notes
1952	WBRE-TV	Wilkes-Barre, Pennsylvania	First TV job
1953	WEEU-TV	Reading, Pennsylvania	WEEU-TV was a short-lived TV station replaced by WITF-TV, anchored the weekend TV news at 11 pm and did the weather at 6:15 pm
1956-1963	WFIL-TV	Philadelphia, Pennsylvania	Breakfast Time, substitute booth announcer on American Bandstand, host of Hess's Fashion/Toy shows, the Thanksgiving Day Parade and the Mummers Parade
1964	WRCV-TV	Philadelphia, Pennsylvania	Hosted TV quiz show Tug-o-War (cancelled so the studio could be used for The Mike Douglas Show) and regionally syndicated Challenge Billiards
1965-1975	WPHL-TV	Philadelphia, Pennsylvania	The Wee Willie Webber Colorful Cartoon Club, The Bill Webber Show (the Philadelphia Phillies' pregame show)
1976-1979	WKBS-TV	Philadelphia, Pennsylvania	Kids Block
2000	WHYY-TV	Philadelphia, Pennsylvania	A Walk Up Broad Street

== Radio ==
Year	Station	City	Notes
1949	WGYN	New York, New York	First broadcast job
1950-1951	Armed Forces Radio	Honshu, Japan	Korean War, nicknamed the "Honshu Cowboy" for playing country music to the U.S. troops
1952	WLAN-AM	Lancaster, Pennsylvania	
1953	WPEN-AM	Philadelphia, Pennsylvania	Sunday shift
1954-1963	WFIL-AM & WFIL-FM	Philadelphia, Pennsylvania	Started as a summer relief announcer, then hosted an evening shift followed by an afternoon show
1964-1965	WRCV-AM	Philadelphia, Pennsylvania	Did celebrity interviews that ran locally on WRCV-AM and nationally on NBC Radio Network program Monitor, played last record before switch to KYW-AM all-news format
1966-1988	WIP-AM	Philadelphia, Pennsylvania	Long time mid-day host
1989-2005	WPEN-AM	Philadelphia, Pennsylvania	Long-running Saturday show during "Station of the Stars" period
2006-2010	WVLT-FM	Vineland, New Jersey	Sunday afternoon show
2009-2010	WHAT-AM	Philadelphia, Pennsylvania	Mid-day program
