= Jetter Mars =

Japanese anime series

- Jetter Mars Encyclopedia cover, illustrated by Noboru Miyama, 1977
- ジェッターマルス
- Genre: Science fiction
- Created by: Osamu Tezuka; Tezuka Productions
- Developed by: Masuo Maruyama
- Directed by: Rintaro
- Music by: Nobuyoshi Koshibe
- Country of origin: Japan
- Original language: Japanese
- No. of episodes: 27

Production
- Production companies: Fuji Television; Toei Animation

Original release
- Network: FNS (Fuji TV)
- Release: February 3 – September 15, 1977

Jetter Mars (ジェッターマルス, Jettā Marusu) is an anime series directed by Rintaro and conceptualized by Osamu Tezuka. It was produced by Toei Animation and debuted on Fuji TV on the 3rd of February, 1977. The story follows a robot boy named Jetter Mars who must learn the difference between right and wrong under the care of two conflicting parental figures: Director Yamanoue, who wishes to use Mars as a tool for war, and Professor Kawashimo, who believes Mars should be raised similarly to a human boy.

Jetter Mars was conceptualized as an animated television show, but supplemental manga were published alongside the show's run to promote the show. Primarily, Ikehara Shigeto's version of the manga published in TV Land magazine, which had some of its chapters reprinted and compiled into a paperback manga in 2019.

== Development ==
Unlike the vast majority of Osamu Tezuka's characters, Jetter Mars was not first published in comic book form, written and illustrated by Tezuka, but the character does bear physical resemblance to the titular character of Tezuka's previous work, Tetsuwan Atom. Initially, Jetter Mars was planned as a sequel series to Tetsuwan Atom called Mighty Mars (マイティ・マルス Maiti Marusu)

In the original pitch written by Osamu Tezuka, Dr. Ochanomizu wished to rebuild Atom after the events of the final episode of the 1963 version of the Tetsuwan Atom anime. Dr. Ochanomizu seeks out Dr. Tenma, who has isolated himself on Mars. Ochanomizu begs Tenma to rebuild Atom, but refuses. Instead, Dr. Tenma shares blueprints for a new robot: "Mighty Mars", who Ochanomizu would name in honor of Tenma who isolated himself on Mars. Mighty Mars would have all of Astro Boy's abilities, but amplified. he'd also be more human than Atom was. His more human-like nature leads to trouble, as he can act selfish. He makes mistakes, causes trouble, and is tempted by others. The pitch script compares this aspect of Mars' character to Pinocchio.

In the end, the Astro Boy aspects were removed and Mars' backstory changed with it. Mars' name would be changed to Jetter Mars and the origin of his name would change to him being named after the roman god of war, Mars. Rather than having all of Atom's abilities, Jetter Mars' abilities would be stripped down to super strength, flying, searchlight eyes, and super hearing.

Some episodes of Jetter Mars closely mirror that of classic stories Tezuka wrote and drew in his Tetsuwan Atom manga, with The Artificial Sun being the most blatant, replacing the Sherlock Holmes parody with a James Bond parody and replacing the artificial sun with a cryogenic freezing device. The Artificial Sun withstanding, episodes mirroring Tetsuwan Atom stories mix in or introduce many new elements into the stories, significantly changing the story and creating something more original than might be expected, sharing only similar characters and/or moral lesson.

In the Tezuka tradition, the series showcased many of his characters from his various manga works in different roles.

In the same manner he wrote and illustrated his Tetsuwan Atom manga, Tezuka stayed away from graphic violence in Jetter Mars, although the typical traits of his works are also present in it, such as the importance of moral values, humanity.

The series was received by Japan's population with mixed feelings, as some wanted the original Tetsuwan Atom and some accepted Jetter Mars wholeheartedly as a different character, as it was intended to be. This made Tezuka to lose interest in the series and it finished with 27 episodes produced.

== Plot ==
The story is set in the future, the year 2015. Two scientists, Professor Kawashimo and Director Yamanoue, have constructed a highly sophisticated robot. Professor Kawashimo created his highly advanced artificial intelligence, gifting him with the personality of a young boy, and the capacity to learn and grow. While Director Yamanoue designed the robot's body, which was constructed by the Ministry of science and endowed with astoundingly powerful abilities. Director Yamanoue names the robot Jetter Mars, taking him into the care of the Ministry of Science. Professor Kawashimo and Director Yamanoue are at odds with each other regarding the purpose of Mars' creation and how he should be raised. Director Yamanoue designed him to be a tool of war and insists on training him as such, while Professor Kawashimo programmed his AI to behave like a normal boy. Mars himself seems to struggle with these two sides of himself, enjoying acts of destruction and mischief and feeling bad when it ends up hurting people. With the help of Professor Kawashimo and his kindhearted robot daughter Miri, whom Mars has taken a liking to, Mars will learn kindness and beauty. From his father, Director Yamanoue, Mars will train for battle, and learn to use his destructive abilities. It's up to Mars which one he decides to indulge in.

=== Characters ===
The series featured many of Tezuka's most well-known characters, as well as some specifically created ones.

As expected from Osamu Tezuka, he put his "character acting company", known as Star System, to use to define the cast of Jetter Mars. He created a few characters specifically for the series, such as Mars and Melchi, and the vast majority of the cast consisted of classic and well-known characters from Tezuka's works, playing various roles. In the adjacent picture, it is possible to identify many of Tezuka's characters, from left to right: Daedalus, Shunsaku Ban aka Higeoyaji, and Tezuka himself in the upper row; Inspector Tawashi, Rock Holmes, and Marakubi Boon in the middle row; and Tamao, Shibugaki, Spider, Chief Nakamura, HamEgg, Acetylene Lamp, Ken'ichi, and Hyōtan-tsugi in the lower row; among some others.

The following list describes the characters featured more prominently during the series:

Jetter Mars (ジェッターマルス, Jettā Marusu): The protagonist of the series. A powerful robot built in the image of a boy, he has a body that can be used for destruction of cataclysmic proportions, and a near-human artificial intelligence. Mars was designed as a machine for war, and thus named his creation after the Roman god of war. He finds himself often in the predicament of needing to find a balance between his boy heart and overwhelming strength.

Melchi (メルチ, Meruchi): Mars' younger brother, with the body of a baby. Endowed with tremendous physical strength, his only word is "Bakaruchi!" (バカルチ, Bakaruchi) (a word invented by Tezuka with no real meaning). He will also, however rare, speak a sentence.

Miri (美理, Miri): A robot made in the image of a young girl by Dr. Kawashimo. She possessed powers that enabled her to restore destroyed robots and machinery. She is the sister of Mars and Melchi and the daughter of Dr. Kawashimo.

Dr. Kawashimo (川下博士, Kawashimo Hakase): Creator of Jetter Mars' artificial intelligence and heart, and creator of Miri and Melchi. Opposing fellow scientist Dr. Yamanoue, he desired Mars to live a life of good purpose and peace.

Dr. Yamanoue (山之上博士, Yamanoue Hakase): A renowned roboticist responsible for designing Mars. Mars looked up to him as his father. He disappears after the testing of a new gravity weapon.

Dr. Tezuka (手塚博士, Tezuka Hakase): In many of his works, Tezuka drew himself as a character, immersed in the universe of his creations, and interacting with his characters. He was included in the Televiland manga adaptation as a famous roboticist whom Dr. Yamanoue sees as a rival.

Spider (スパイダー, Supaidā) and Hyōtan-tsugi (ひょうたんつぎ, Hyōtan-tsugi): Two cartoonish characters which briefly appear as comic relief. Hyōtan-tsugi usually appeared falling in front of a character at the most inappropriate of times, and getting kicked out angrily by them, and Spider usually appeared in moments of tension, uttering his trademark phrase, Omukae de gonsu! (おむかえでごんすﾞ, Omukae de gonsu), roughly "Here ta meet ya!". Additionally, Hyōtan-tsugi appeared in each episode during the end credits sequence. Spider appears only in the manga and the opening of the Jetter Mars anime.

HamEgg (ﾊﾑｴｯｸﾞ, Hamueggu): One of Tezuka's most recognizable characters in his Star System. As usual, he is up to no good in Jetter Mars, running a robotic circus. In the anime, he tricks Mars into performing for his circus, but in the manga, HamEgg tricks Mars' little brother, Melchi, into joining the circus instead. Both of them end up sapped of their energy due to HamEgg being upset at them.

== Episode list ==
The series had 27 episodes, each lasting approximately 24 minutes. It was broadcast by Fuji TV on Thursday nights. As with all of Tezuka's works, the series made use of his Star System cast, featuring many of his characters from previous works (manga or animated) performing various roles. The following list includes the episode titles, airing dates, and episode summaries.

No.	Original title (English) Original title (Japanese)	Original air date (Japan)
1	"Mars is Born, Year 2015"; Transliteration: "2015 nen Marusu tanjō" (Japanese: 2015年マルス誕生)	February 3, 1977
In the futuristic year of 2015, Dr. Yamanoue, the Director of the Ministry of Science, has been working on creating a powerful boy robot on an artificial island located in Tokyo Bay. Although he has created the body of the robot, it still lacks an artificial brain. That's when he ordered Dr. Kawashimo, a scientist specialized in creating electronic brains, to create an advanced electronic brain for the robot. Dr. Kawashimo hurries to the island at the request of Dr. Yamanoue, taking his young daughter, Miri, along. Despite being partners, Yamanoue and Kawashimo are, in reality, rivals not only in their personal lives but also in their scientific studies. Dr. Yamanoue is very patriotic and only thinks of the robot as one of his weapons. On the contrary, Dr. Kawashimo is a pacifist and treats robots like humans. Arriving on the island, Dr. Kawashimo installs the electronic brain into the boy robot, and Yamanoue names him Jetter Mars. Thus, Mars was born into the world. Despite being powerful, Mars is as naive as an ordinary child. The following day, he carries Dr. Kawashimo and Miri up onto the building after being ordered by Dr. Yamanoue to drive them away. His antics eventually caused Miri to burst into tears. After he sees a drop of water flowing down Miri's eyes, he inquires Dr. Yamanoue about it, to which Yamanoue tells him that it is called a tear, and that a strong man has no need for such a thing. As a thunderstorm rolls in, lightning strikes cause the powerful combat robot, Faitan, to go haywire. Faitan goes on a wild rampage, and the island is at risk of sinking. Miri is soon revealed to be a robot created by Dr. Kawashimo and is told by him to head to the power plant, along with Mars. After they patched up the hole that is leaking water, they are attacked by Faitan. Mars effortlessly defeats Faitan and throws it into the ocean. He tells Miri that it feels good to save people. At last, they rescue Dr. Yamanoue and Dr. Kawashimo from being washed away by seawater. Dr. Yamanoue bawls his eyes out that his weapons laboratory is gone, to which Mars laughs at the irony that Yamanoue was the one who taught him that man does not need tears.
2	"Robot Trafficking Ring"; Transliteration: "Robotto mitsuyudan" (Japanese: ロボット密輸団)	February 10, 1977
Jetter Mars is being forced by his creator and father, Yamanoue, to study 23/7, to the point of being sophisticated enough to assemble a mini TV in 10 seconds. When he turns it on, a news channel reports about a boy who has run away from home after being sickened by his mother forcing him to study constantly. He inquires Yamanoue about what it means to run away, to which Yamanoue responds that it means leaving home without his parents' permission. Mars then storms out of his home and visits Miri and Dr. Kawashimo. Due to his naivety and lack of common sense, instead of entering through the front door, he breaks through the ceiling of their house. The news then reports that the boy has been found, and his mother hugs him, apologizing for neglecting him. This sparks an idea in Mars' head that if he runs away like the boy did, Yamanoue might also hug and apologize to him for treating him harshly. Mars takes off and flies over the ocean, where he discovers a ship full of criminals who profit from trafficking robots. When the naive Mars boards the ship, thinking he might have some fun, he is tricked into being held captive. They intend to turn Mars into a criminal to help them commit crimes. Dr. Kawashimo remembers that Mars has a tracking device on him and orders Miri to look for him. When Mars finds out he is being forced to study again, he attempts to escape, but is paralyzed by the ship's electromagnetic barrier. The traffickers decide that they're better off selling Mars as scrap metal. Miri rescues Mars just in the nick of time, but they are stopped by the barrier and fall into the ocean. As they hide, Mars learns about what it's like to be afraid, as he was the one who stopped the Jet Scooter, saving himself and Miri. Mars defeats the criminals by redirecting the torpedoes towards the ship, causing it to explode. The coastguards arrive to rescue Mars, Miri, and the captive robots and arrest the criminals.
3	"Why is Mars Crying?"; Transliteration: "Marusu naze naku" (Japanese: マルスなぜ泣く)	February 17, 1977
During his time with Miri in an amusement park, Mars ends up making many boys cry due to his reckless behavior. When he asks Miri about why those boys cried, Miri tells him that all boys cry when they are sad, to which Mars responds that he isn't capable of crying. Dr. Yamanoue shows up and takes Mars home, revealing that the following day will be the recovery ceremony of the Ministry of Science. Dr. Yamanoue puts Mars up against a professional robot fighter named Mad Mask to prove Mars' worth to Prime Minister Nonohara. Mars is carefree and isn't afraid of what he is getting into. Before the match begins, Dr. Kawashimo and Miri are part of the audience, ready to rescue Mars in case things get out of hand. During the battle, Mars accidentally injures Miri's pet pigeon, Kuru, which was flying around the area. As Mars holds the injured Kuru in his hand, Mad Mask chose to surrender the match, since he refuses to harm those who are unwilling to fight him. Sometime later, Yamanoue and Mars receive a letter from Mad Mask, requesting another match between him and Mars. Dr. Yamanoue tears up the letter, believing it to be pointless for a rematch. Not receiving the answer he wanted, Mad Mask captures Kuru and forces Mars to have another battle with him. The battle is interrupted when a volcano suddenly erupts, putting the city in danger of being destroyed. As lava began to leak from the dam, Mars and Mad Mask worked together to block the hole to save the city. Kuru helps by notifying Miri, and Dr. Yamanoue and his crew come to the rescue by reinforcing the dam. Unfortunately, they were not able to patch up the hole that Mad Mask was blocking. Mad Mask sacrifices himself to save the city and tells Mars that blocking the holes with him was a test of their endurance. Mad Mask deemed himself victorious in his rematch against Mars and is happy that he can finally rest in peace after spending his whole life fighting. Unable to bear the sight of Mad Mask dying, Mars sheds a tear and flies off with Kuru, finally learning about what it's like to cry.
4	"Goodbye, Little Brother!"; Transliteration: "Sayōnara, otōto!" (Japanese: さようならオトウト！)	February 24, 1977
While Dr. Yamanoue was training Jetter Mars in a war scenario, Mars was being distracted by a picture book about puppies that Dr. Kawashimo gave him as a gift. An enraged Dr. Yamanoue then calls Dr. Kawashimo and starts blaming him for distracting Mars and interfering with his affairs. However, Dr. Kawashimo argues that the future of robots won't rely on strength alone and that Mars needs a heart and soul. Dr. Yamanoue then tears up the book before starting another battle training session with Mars. As they return home, Dr. Yamanoue almost runs over a puppy on the road. Mars panics and knocks Dr. Yamanoue's car off the road and saves the puppy. Mars finds the puppy adorable and immediately wants to have it as his little brother. When a tank suddenly attacks them, Mars ends up blackmailing Dr. Yamanoue, telling him that he will save him only if he agrees to let him keep the puppy. With no other choice, Dr. Yamanoue lets Mars keep the puppy, and Mars destroys the tank with ease. As Mars gets attached to this puppy, Dr. Kawashimo begins to worry about the tank that attacked Dr. Yamanoue and Mars, and convinces Dr. Yamanoue to inspect the puppy. The puppy suddenly attacks Dr. Yamanoue aggressively and reveals itself to be a robot. As Yamanoue tries to disassemble the robot puppy, Mars refuses to hand it over, since he won't let anyone hurt his little brother. Mars then runs away with the puppy and finds a hideout at an abandoned lighthouse. Dr. Yamanoue and Kawashimo analyze a projection of the mechanical inner workings of the puppy, discovering a bomb inside it. They're soon confronted by a group of gangsters led by a man named Niningashikaku. The evildoers revealed the fact that they were the ones who created that puppy and threatened to destroy Mars if they didn't return the puppy by dawn. Dr. Kawashimo and Miri find Mars and convince him to hand over the puppy and remove the bomb before the gangsters arrive, but they are too late. As the gangsters arrive, Mars defeats them all easily, but the gangster leader threatens to blow up the puppy and force Mars to leave the puppy in a fly pod. Unwilling to leave his brother behind, Mars charges into the pod at the last second, thinking he can somehow save the puppy. However, the pilot is revealed to be a dummy with a speaker. As the defeated Niningashikaku detonates the bomb in the puppy, it becomes berserk and saves Mars by pushing him out of the pod before exploding. The following day, Mars wakes up, having no memory of what had happened. Dr. Yamanoue reveals that he had erased part of Mars' memory. When Mars returns to the lighthouse, he is strangely familiar with the place. When he met a puppy and a bigger dog, he seemed to partially remember having a brother at one point.
5	"The Greatest Robot Talent of All Time"; Transliteration: "Shijō saikō no robotto Tarento" (Japanese: 史上最高のロボットタレント)	March 3, 1977
In another intense battle training, Mars learns about the ability to endure from Dr. Yamanoue. He tells Mars that he's the only robot with such a capability and pushes Mars to his limits. Mars then escapes from the Ministry of Science with Miri, who also told Mars to endure it after a police robot angered Mars. They later meet Ham Egg and Ham Salad, a couple in charge of an entertainment company, who invited Mars to star in their show. Despite Miri's objections, Mars signs the contract and becomes the star of their show. When Miri tries to stop him, she suddenly becomes unresponsive and is sent to the hospital. However, Mars is too excited about being a star in the Ham Egg and Ham Salad's show, and leaves Miri alone in the hospital, unaware that Miri was drained of all her energy. After Mars performs poorly, Ham Egg and Ham Salad show their true colors and verbally abuse him. However, when they noticed his high horsepower, they put Mars against their giant robot named Mr. Powerful. Mars easily overpowers the robot, which satisfies the couple into making him the star of the show. During his first time on stage, Mars meets a clown robot performer named Mr. Pierro, who explains how he's been mistreated by the couple in charge of the company and was left shabby after he performed poorly once on stage. He encouraged Mars to endure the pain, which led Mars to recall Yamanoue and Miri both telling him to endure it as well. As a result, Mars refused to fight Mr. Powerful despite Ham Egg's insistence. Feeling humiliated, Ham Egg and Ham Salad punishes Mars by draining his energy. When Mars refuses to fight back, Mr. Pierro attempts to save him by confessing that it was his fault. Furious, Ham Egg and Ham Salad orders Mr. Powerful to destroy Mr. Pierro. Unable to handle Mr. Pierro being hurt, Mars finally gains back the will to fight, but is at a disadvantage due to his energy being drained immensely. Fortunately, he is able to get the upper hand in the end and defeats Mr. Powerful. He crawls over to a beaten Mr. Pierro and tells him that he has endured it and won. Just as Ham Egg is about to shoot Mars, he is stopped by Miri, Dr. Kawashimo, and Dr. Yamanoue, who came to rescue him.
6	"The Girl from the Planet of Dreams"; Transliteration: "Yume no hoshi kara kita shōjo" (Japanese: 夢の星から来た少女)	March 10, 1977
Dr. Flame, a scientist obsessed with researching a species of aliens that travel the universe in the form of an orb of blue light, reaches out to Dr. Yamanoue for help. Yamanoue reluctantly agrees and sends Mars to investigate the blue lights that Dr. Flame spotted. One of the orbs of light is left behind, and inside it is a humanoid alien girl. When Mars approaches her, she cries in fear, but Mars assures her that he means no harm to her. They both sneak past and evade Dr. Flame and his robot army, who are also searching for her. The girl named herself Dory and quickly became friends with Mars. She explains how she envisioned Earth in her dream and was fascinated by its beauty. However, she feared that she might be in danger if humans saw her wings. Therefore, Mars gave her some clothes and took her to his home. Dr. Yamanoue scolds Mars for ignoring his duties and mistakes him for playing with Dory as an excuse. Soon, he receives another call from Dr. Flame, who discovers Dory alongside Dr. Yamanoue. Enraged, Dr. Flame blames Dr. Yamanoue for stealing his research and coerces him to hand over Dory. In spite of Mars' disapproval, Yamanoue agrees, allowing Dr. Flame to come and take Dory away. When Mars continues to oppose his father, Yamanoue attaches an attenuator to Mars' back, reducing Mars' strength to one-tenth of his normal level, and proceeds to lock him away. As Dr. Flame arrives to capture Dory, she escapes on foot and is rescued by Dr. Kawashimo and Miri. Dr. Flame proceeds to surround Dr. Kawashimo's house with his robot army and forces them to give up Dory to him. Mars came just in time to rescue her, prompting Dr. Flame to challenge him to fight against his powerful robot, Star Kong. With his strength reduced to only one-tenth of his normal level, Mars is overpowered by Star Kong, as Dr. Flame takes advantage of the weakened Mars. Dr. Yamanoue, Kawashimo, and Miri come to the rescue and remove the attenuator from Mars' back. Just as Dr. Flame was about to blow up Mars, Dory sacrificed herself to save him. With his strength restored, Mars destroys Star Kong with ease and throws the robot at Dr. Flame, killing him. Dory, back in her light orb form, thanks Mars for fighting for her and floats away. The episode concludes with Mars having a dream about playing with Dory in a land filled with flowers. Mars then wakes up excited that he finally had a dream and calls out to Dory beyond the night sky.
7	"Missing Miri"; Transliteration: "Kieta Miri" (Japanese: 消えた美理)	March 17, 1977
One night, on her way back home, Miri is suddenly kidnapped by a group of gangsters. Dr. Yamanoue receives a call from Dr. Kawashimo, stating that Miri has yet to return, prompting Mars to go out searching for her. Mars is confronted by a big robot named Bruiser, but their fight is cut short as Bruiser flees from the police. Mars then encounters a man named Skunk, who is the leader of the same gangsters who kidnapped Miri. Skunk claims that he found Miri fainted on the road and took her back to his place, convincing Mars to follow him to his auto repair shop, where Mars discovers Miri unconscious on a couch. Due to their good-natured attitude towards him, Mars wrongly assumes that the gangsters are merely kind people trying to help others out. When Mars reencounters Bruiser, who turns out to be one of Skunk's subordinates, Skunk rebukes Bruiser for attacking Mars. Skunk then requests Mars to help them break through some solid rocks in their underground tunnel, to which Mars agrees. Bruiser intervenes and stops Mars from smashing through the wall, and discloses that Skunk and his men are gangsters who kidnapped Miri and are taking advantage of Mars to break into a bank vault and commit a robbery. When Mars hurries back to save Miri, the gangsters hold Miri hostage and demand that Mars open the bank vault. Bruiser interferes, and Mars quickly saves Miri, who wakes up having no idea what had happened. After Skunk and his gang destroyed Bruiser for betraying them and fled, the dying Bruiser explains to Mars that he was initially a planet-exploring robot that Skunk had stolen in order to commit robbery, and all Bruiser wanted was to make Skunk quit being a criminal. In order to avenge Bruiser, Mars pursues Skunk and forces him and his gang to surrender to the authorities. The episode concludes with Mars and Miri visiting Bruiser's grave and paying their respects.
8	"Dad, Where Did You Go?"; Transliteration: "Otōsan doko okonatta no?" (Japanese: お父さんどこ行ったの？)	March 24, 1977
After Mars disobeys his father and refuses to study, Yamanoue takes Mars on a Tour around Japan. Surprised that his father didn't scold him instead, Mars inquires Yamanoue about why, to which Yamanoue explains that he showed him the beauty of Japan because he wanted Mars to protect the country with all his might. Yamanoue's sudden kindness towards him made Mars grow more fond of him. The following morning, Mars refuses to accompany Yamanoue to a weapons experiment test and instead visits Miri. Mars learns from Kawashimo that the dangerous experiment Yamanoue was conducting was a gravity weapon test located near a nuclear power plant, which puts many people's lives in danger. Mars, along with Miri and Dr. Kawashimo, rushed to the site, but they were too late. The experiment has gone wrong, and Yamanoue is nowhere to be seen. While he manages to save the power plant, Mars is unable to find Yamanoue. Refusing to give up searching for his father, Mars, Miri, and Kawashimo visit the Ministry of Science to check on the director, who is revealed to have already returned to his office. However, in the office, they were instead greeted by a new director named Tawashi, who claimed that Yamanoue had died during the experiment. As the new director of the Ministry of Science, Tawashi has the authority over Mars and decides to drain him of all of his energy using his two robot bodyguards, Aung No. 1 and 2. Mars defeats the robots and forces Tawashi to sign an agreement, relinquishing ownership of all of Yamanoue's properties. Although Dr. Kawashimo and Miri have custody of Mars and Yamanoue's belongings, Mars is still depressed about losing his father and refuses to leave his room, located next to what used to be Yamanoue's office.
9	"Lamp, The Space Garbage Man"; Transliteration: "Uchū no shimatsujin Ranpu" (Japanese: 宇宙の始末人ランプ)	March 31, 1977
After losing his father, Mars falls into depression and won't cheer up even when accompanied by Miri and Dr. Kawashimo. He eventually catches the attention of a man named Acetylene Lamp, who plans on abducting Mars to make his job as a space garbage man easier. The following day, Lamp shows up unannounced at Dr. Kawashimo's house and tricks Mars into believing his father is in space. Desperately wanting to see his father again, Mars follows Lamp and gets trapped in a special device. When Dr. Kawashimo finds out, he brings out a spaceship so Miri can pursue Lamp into space. Realizing he's being followed, Lamp attempts to destroy Miri's spaceship. Miri ends up crashing into Lamp's ship, freeing Mars, who defeats Lamp and traps him in the same device he used to trap Mars. Mars then flies back home with Miri using Lamp's spaceship. The following day, Mars is in much better shape due to the adventure he had the day before. Dr. Kawashimo completes Dr. Yamanoue's unfinished work, and it's revealed to be a baby robot who is Mars' little brother.
10	"My Little Brother's Name is Melchi"; Transliteration: "Otōto no na wa Meruchi" (Japanese: 弟の名はメルチ)	April 7, 1977
The Kawashimo family celebrates Mars' little brother's birthday and names him Melchi, before Melchi's antics ruin the entire party. The following day, Mars takes Melchi to a park before losing track of him after being confronted by police officers who accuse Mars of being a kidnapper. It turns out that, coincidentally, a baby robot that looks identical to Melchi, who was raised by a woman named Mrs. Tabasco, was missing. Dr. Kawashimo, Miri, and Mars attempt to clear the misunderstanding by having the Ministry of Science's director, Tawashi, prove that Melchi and the missing child robot are unrelated, but Tawashi brushes them off, stating that Melchi has no affiliation with the Ministry since Dr. Yamanoue is no longer the director. Melchi is later spotted at a zoo, wreaking havoc. As Mars, Miri, and Dr. Kawashimo arrive at the zoo, they encounter Mrs. Tabasco, who claims that Melchi was her robot baby. As the police and robot army settle everything, Mrs. Tabasco takes Melchi away, much to the dismay of Mars, who attempts to stop her. Mrs. Tabasco threatens legal action against Mars, where if he tries to take Melchi from her, he will be scrapped by the Ministry of Science. Miri consoles Mars, assuring him that he has done nothing wrong. Mrs. Tabasco turns out to be the wife of a third-rate scientist named Dr. Spice, who had premeditated the kidnapping of Melchi. With their hands on Melchi, they plan on traveling to America to become famous. Before they can leave, Mars, who learned about their true intention, catches up with them to free Melchi from their grasp. However, Melchi ends up retaliating against Mars, still annoyed with how Mars treated him the day before. Tawashi interferes with the fight, leaving Melchi unconscious. Dr. Kawashimo ends up clearing the misunderstanding by having Mars wake up Melchi with his pacifier. Exposed as kidnappers, Dr. Spice and Mrs. Tabasco attempt to flee but are swiftly apprehended by Mars. The episode ends with the Kawashimo family driving home to re-celebrate Melchi's birthday.
11	"Freshman Mars"; Transliteration: "Shin'nyūsei Marusu" (Japanese: 新入生マルス)	April 14, 1977
Mars has been living a fun and peaceful life with Dr. Kawashimo and his family. However, after Melchi and Mars' destructive behavior continues to disrupt the daily routine of the Kawashimo family, Dr. Kawashimo decides to send Mars to school. Mars, who still despises studying, initially refuses, prompting Dr. Kawashimo to come up with a special plan. The following day, a man named Mr. Mustachio shows up unannounced at Kawashimo's home and catches Mars' attention. He persuades Mars to assist him with his private investigation, and they end up in front of a school. Mr. Mustachio revealed that he is actually a teacher, and their "investigation" was an elaborate plan to get Mars to school. Mars reluctantly enters and immediately starts to make friends with his classmates, Ken, Tamao, and Shibugaki. The students were flabbergasted by Mars' abilities and strength. After everyone is dismissed, Mars is suddenly kidnapped by a thug leader named Mason, who is responsible for programming robots to commit crimes. Mr. Mustachio and Mars' fellow classmates pursue him into a secret factory, where they are ambushed by Mason and his bodyguard robot, Heck. Mars breaks free of his bondage and saves them just in time before defeating Heck and chasing Mason into the factory. Mason and his gang try to escape by subway train, but Mars catches up with them and carries the train into the police station. The episode ends with Mars returning home, uplifted by his adventure.
12	"Secret Agent, Jam Bond"; Transliteration: "Himitsu chōhōin Jamu Bondo" (Japanese: ヒミツ諜報員ジャムボンド)	April 21, 1977
A massive cryogenic orb terrorized the planet, freezing everything around it. Mars is assigned to a private investigation with a British secret agent named Jam Bond. Jam Bond, who despises robots, refuses to get along with Mars and decides to abandon him. After learning who created the cryogenic orb, Bond sneaks into Dr. Kawashimo's laboratory and discovers blueprints of it, and confronts Dr. Kawashimo. Dr. Kawashimo admits that he created the machine with another scientist 10 years ago when exploring an unknown planet to withstand its extreme heat, and is adamant that he is not responsible for using the cryostat to commit crimes. Their conversation is cut short after a group of armed goons storms the laboratory and kidnaps Dr. Kawashimo. Mars, still searching for Bond, flies to India and encounters the cryostat. Mars attempts to throw it into the ocean, but is trapped and frozen. The criminal mastermind behind the stolen cryostat is Kin Sankaku, who captured Dr. Kawashimo in order to enhance it. However, the Dr. Kawashimo that was captured turns out to be Jam Bond in disguise. Mars tricks the bodyguard robot into freeing him and saves Jam Bond from Kin Sankaku and his gang. Kin Sankaku, in his last resort, destroys the control device, causing the cryostat to become haywire. To prevent the world from freezing over, Mars tosses the cryostat into outer space. Frozen again, he falls back down to Earth, saying goodbye to his family. Fortunately, he was rescued by Dr. Kawashimo and Miri and unfrozen. Mars rushes to check on Jam Bond, who is undergoing surgery. After a successful surgery, Jam Bond thanks Mars for saving his life and everyone's, and accepts Mars as a friend despite being a robot. The episode ends with Mars flying around excitedly because he has befriended Jam Bond.
13	"Robot Exchange-Student, Honey"; Transliteration: "Robotto Tenkōsei Hanī" (Japanese: ロボット転校生ハニー)	April 28, 1977
Melchi and Miri are deprived of their energy after being attacked by a swarm of robot bees. Dr. Kawashimo explains how these very bees have been traveling from south to north, starting in Kyushu, and finally arriving in Tokyo. When Mars goes out to investigate, he comes across an unconscious robot girl named Honey in the middle of nowhere. Just as Honey regains consciousness, her grandpa shows up and takes her home. When Mars questions him about the robot bees, the man brushes him off, claiming Honey was simply ill. The next day, Honey shows up at Mars' class as a transfer student, who explains that she has transferred from many schools in Japan, including Nagoya and Kyoto. Mars then recalls that the robot bees are appearing in the same places as her. Honey refuses to participate in physical education and is dismissed from school early, along with Mars, who informs Dr. Kawashimo about her. Suspecting her grandpa to be the culprit behind the bee attacks, they visit Honey's address, but are greeted by a stranger who knows nothing about her. The following morning, Honey is absent from school, despite having shown up for the first time the day before. Mars leaves early and searches for her, only to get attacked by the robot bees himself. Miri and Melchi arrive and replenish his energy, and discover Honey and her grandpa in a nearby trailer. Mars overhears Honey's grandpa attempting to convince Honey to cease contact with Mars and continue to move North, much to the dismay of Honey, who insists on making new friends. When questioned by Mars and Miri, Dr. Kawashimo explains that Honey is likely one of the few surviving SLX robots, an older model that consumes about 100 times as much energy as modern robots. Since then, the Ministry of Science has been dismantling the SLX robots wherever they are found, explaining why Honey's grandpa wants to keep her hidden and steal energy from other robots. Suddenly, the robot bees began attacking humans. When Tawashi and his robot army are quickly overwhelmed, Mars shows up and offers to help out if Tawashi rewards him with robot energy, to which he agrees. After Mars receives a year's worth of robot energy, he visits Honey, who is moving North. Mars finds out the sad truth that Honey will use up all the energy in less than 4 days. Honey accepts it regardless and convinces her grandpa to work hard to earn robot energy rather than stealing it. The episode ends with Honey excitedly trying physical education for the very first time, as her grandpa and Mars shed tears.
14	"The Vampire from Outer Space"; Transliteration: "Uchū kara no Kyūketsuki" (Japanese: 宇宙からの吸血鬼)	May 5, 1977
Tokyo is being terrorized by an unknown assailant who abducts his victim at night after a UFO crashes into Earth nearby. The Kawashimo family is stalked by the kidnapper who has a grudge against Dr. Kawashimo. One night, Mars and Miri are attacked by bats and the mysterious kidnapper, who backs off after discovering that Miri is a robot. Mars and the police chase the kidnapper into the tunnel, only to lose track of him. The kidnapper confronts Dr. Kawashimo in his house and reveals his true identity and motivation. He was initially a space test pilot named Koichi Hoshi who had been presumed dead after an accident occurred when he was testing Kawashimo's newly designed engine. Koichi escaped at the last second and was on the brink of death before being rescued by Chlorians, a race of aliens that cannot tolerate sunlight and absorbs the life energy out of other organisms. The aliens revived Koichi and transformed him into a corrupted human possessing the abilities, strengths, and weaknesses of a Chlorian, naming him Curado. Curado swore revenge on the humans who had abandoned him and gladly guided the Chlorians to Earth to feed on them. Before Curado can absorb Dr. Kawashimo's life energy, Mars saves him in the nick of time and chases Curado away. Curado returns the following night and abducts Dr. Kawashimo during his sleep, attempting to transfer his brilliant mind into the leader of the Chlorian race, Lord Goro. Mars intervenes and rescues Kawashimo before engaging in a battle against Curado and his aliens. Despite being overwhelmed, Mars manages to hold up Curado and the Chlorians until dawn, where the sunlight vaporizes Curado, Goro, and the remaining Chlorians. While Kawashimo treats Curado's victims, Mars sympathizes with Curado's death, despite the awful things Curado has done, saying that Curado was once a human as well, and he will never forget him.
15	"Melchi Likes Mooster"; Transliteration: "Meruchi no sukina Mousutā" (Japanese: メルチのすきなモウスター)	May 12, 1977
The Ministry of Science receives a threatening phone call from an anonymous man who plans on wreaking havoc on the Ministry's headquarters. Dr. Kawashimo recognizes the caller's voice but isn't sure of his true identity. When the base is under attack by a giant bull-headed robot named Mooster, Mars is called in to stop the chaos. Melchi suddenly appears out of nowhere, halting Mooster's rampage. When Mars and the soldiers retaliate, Melchi is taken away by Mooster, who was ordered to retreat by his master. When Mooster was ordered to dispose of Melchi, the monster robot refused, as it saw Melchi as its friend. Mooster continues to hold Melchi within its grasp as it attacks the second base of the Ministry. Mars attempts to separate Melchi from Mooster, but Melchi rebels. With no other option, Mars engages in a showdown with Mooster, with Mars being defeated after being blasted by Mooster's Tornado Beam Cannon distrupting his motor circuits. Miri and Dr. Kawashimo come to the rescue. After doing some research, Dr. Kawashimo suspects the mastermind behind this is Dr. Frankenstenten, a scientist who was kicked out of the Ministry for his unethical practices and creations. Mars, along with Tawashi and his soldiers raid Dr. Frankenstenten's hideout. Mars, with his strength restored, destroys Mooster and forces Dr. Frankenstenten to surrender. Dr. Frankenstenten holds Melchi hostage and attempts to escape, but is shot down by Tawashi's soldiers, with Mooster saving Melchi just in time. In the end, Mars feels bad for destroying the Mooster, seeing his friendship with Melchi.
16	"Zaza, The Wandering Planet"; Transliteration: "Samayoeru wakusei Zaza" (Japanese: さまよえる惑星ザザ)	May 19, 1977
An expedition to an unknown planet, Gypsy, goes horribly wrong when the team is attacked by alien creatures. Tawashi assembles a second expedition team requesting Mars to join in. Mars agrees on the condition that Dr. Kawashimo comes along as well. As the crew arrive on Planet Gypsy, Mars gets separated from the team, leaving Tawashi, Kawashimo, and the rest of the members to explore the mysterious planet by themselves. The crew finds the bodies of the previous expedition members, revealing them to be faceless. The aliens, known as Zazanians, ambush them and one of them absorbs the intelligence of Tawashi. The face of the Zazanian that attacked him transforms into that of Tawashi, as the other Zazanians possessing the face of the first expedition team continue their rampage. Mars arrives and fights them off, chasing the Zazanians underground. The alien possessing the face of the first team's leader, Redsnow, commands the other Zazanians to dogpile on Mars. Exhausted, Mars retreats back to his rocket to replenish his energy. As Mars and his team continue their battle against the Zazanians, the Zazanians choose to surrender, fearing they might lose too much of their race if they keep fighting. The Zazanians loses their human faces, and their victims reverted back to normal. As the team departed, the entire planet, revealed to be a spaceship of Zazanians, blasts off deep into outer space in search for creatures with intelligence to feed on.
17	"The Samurai Robot from the 7th Year of the Tenpō era" Transliteration: "Tenpō shichi-nen Samurai robotto" (Japanese: 天保七年サムライロボット)	June 2, 1977
Mars along with his class, goes on a field trip to an amusement park. As they arrive to their destination, Mars meets a tour guide girl who invites everyone to a limestone cave, where it is rumored that a samurai ghost resides inside. When the class seems more in favor of going to the cave than the park, Mr. Mustachio is forced to change their destination. When exploring the cave, one of Mars' friend Tamao, gets lost before being attacked by an unknown presence that sliced his hat in half. As Mars goes to investigate, he finds out the attacker to be a samurai robot. The mountain rumbles and Mars is separated from his classmates and teacher by falling boulders. With his energy reduced to one tenth of his normal amount, Mars is unable to break through the stones. Luckily, Miri and Dr. Kawashimo arrive and send an energy capsule through a water stream. Mars receives the capsule and smashes through the cave with ease. Mars and the others soon discover that the robot samurai was a Karakuri Puppet created to protect a secret treasure hidden deep within the cave. Mars removes the puppet from the cave, assuring that the limestone cave will have more visitors in the future.
18	"An Ancient Robot's Resurrection"; Transliteration: "Yomigaeru kodai robotto" (Japanese: よみがえる古代ロボット)	June 16, 1977
A frightened scientist named Dr. Tsuruhashi is hunted by Kin Sankaku who is after the metal plates discovered on an island, which he deemed valuable. When interviewed, Tsuruhashi immediately flees the scene, evading Sankaku and his gang, arriving at Dr. Kawashimo's house. When Tsuruhashi request Kawashimo to examine the plates, Tawashi intervenes and demands that the plates should be broadcast on TV. Mars tricks Tawashi by switching the plates with broken toys, so Kawashimo can proceed with analyzing them. Kawashimo concludes that the metal plates belongs to the ancient civilization that existed on a special continent called Mau which sank into the ocean, leaving behind some islands. An excavation is dispatched, along with Mars and Kawashimo, to explore the remaining island, where they discover a massive robot inside of a giant capsule. Mars awakens the giant robot named Daedalus and is stunned by his amazing abilities. Kin Sankaku and his gang arrive and hold the excavation team hostage and demand Mars to surrender Daedalus to them. Daedalus gives in, but instead of obeying their command, he grabs the criminals and threatens to self-destruct along with them. Daedalus explains how he was built by the ancient Mau civilization that created a self-destruct circuit within him to prevent him from being used for evil. As Daedalus takes off into the sky, Mars pursues him, begging him to release Kin Sankaku and his underlings, believing they can be reformed without killing them. Daedalus ends up destroying Mars, causing him to have a change of heart. Daedalus repairs Mars with his special powers, releases Kin Sankaku and his gang, and flies off into the sky before self-destructing.
19	"Mars' First Love"; Transliteration: "Marusu no hatsukoi" (Japanese: マルスの初恋)	June 23, 1977
After losing miserably in a baseball competition to a prestigious academy in the United States, Mars' class gets a visit from a female student of the same academy named Agnes. After seeing how skilled and intelligent she was, Mars almost immediately falls in love with Agnes and invites her to his house. However, in reality, Agnes had every intention to befriend Mars, as she was ordered by her coach, Redsnow, to convince Mars to come to their school. Trouble arises as Redsnow's secrets were discovered by an extortionist named Marakubi Boon, who reveals that the majority of the academy's students were robots Redsnow created in order to boost and maintain the school's reputation. When Boon threatens to disclose his secret to the public, Redsnow is forced to capture Mars using Agnes. Agnes shows up to Mars' house and kidnaps Mars by zapping him with an energy gun before taking him to the factory in America where Redsnow is being held captive. Meanwhile, Miri and Mr. Mustachio get suspicious of Agnes and pursue her. With Mars in his hands, Boon plans to modify his electronic brain and sell him for profits and holds Agnes captive by trapping her in an electronic lock. Agnes, unable to bear the loss of her love interest, breaks out of her lock and saves Mars before burning into a unrecognizable figure. Mr. Mustachio and Miri arrive and supply Mars with energy. With his strength restored, Mars chases Boon down and throws him into the ocean, leaving him to drown. Witnessing Agnes as a disfigured corpse, Mars breaks down into tears.
20	"Mars Becomes a Young Boss"; Transliteration: "Marusu waka oyabun ni naru" (Japanese: マルス若親分になる)	June 30, 1977
Dr. Jin, a scientist with a strong believe in masculinity, visits Dr. Kawashimo and implores to test his newly invented circuit on Mars, believing it will make him more manly. Kawashimo refuses, wishing that Mars can live a happy life without so much troubled thoughts. Against the wishes of Kawashimo, Mars visits Jin and learns about his troubled past, where Jin desperately tried searched for the man who had saved him from a fire when he was a baby. The man turns out to be a boss of a Yakuza family called the Ōtebishatori, and served as a role model for manly Japanese men. After Jin joined the family, the boss eventually succumbed to an illness, and the family was disbanded. Jin then became a scientist and created an electrical circuit, named the Manly Circuit, that will allow any robot to imitate his deceased boss. Mars, touched by his story, agrees to allow Jin to install the Manly Circuit on him. To Jin's surprise, the circuit worked and transformed Mars into a serious and chivalrous Yakuza lord. When Miri and Kawashimo arrive, Mars refuses to go home with them, believing it is his duty to protect and restore the honor of the Ōtebishatori family. Jin's plan backfires horribly, however, when two petty hooligans offer to be Mars' disciples, in order to take advantage of him. As more criminals are attracted to the Ōtebishatori family, Tawashi and the police force raid Dr. Jin and Mars, insisting them to surrender all their followers. Believing surrendering would weaken his honor, Mars chooses to retaliate along with all his criminal followers. When Tawashi's forces overpowers them, all of Mars' followers chose to surrender despite Mars' insistence on keep fighting. Desperate on fleeing, the criminals turn on Mars and try to destroy him, severely injuring Dr. Jin. Mars easily defeats and apprehends the criminals. Dr. Kawashimo removes the circuit from Mars, while Dr. Jin is taken to the hospital. As Dr. Jin attempts to take his own life, Mars saves him just in time. Witnessing Mars willing to sacrifice his life for him even without the Manly Circuit, Dr. Jin finally understands his mistakes and destroys his Manly Circuit.
21	"Mighty Robot Joe"; Transliteration: "Tetsuwan Robotto Jō" (Japanese: 鉄腕ロボット・ジョー)	July 7, 1977
Mars meets a man in the park named Joe Asunaro, who is the champion of "Roboxing," boxing between robots. After Joe injured his arm during the fight, Mars pays him a visit the following day, learning how Joe was the first combat robot ever used by Dr. Yamanoue before being sold into robot shop that modified him into a boxing robot. After Mars befriends Joe, they were confronted by two goons who inform Joe that he must return to his boss, Bogart, who reveals that Joe will soon be replaced by a stronger robot boxing champion named Wolfman. Due to Joe's declining popularity, Bogart plans to take Joe apart and use his remains to strengthen Wolfman, but agrees to let Joe walk free if he brings him Mars' electronic brain to replace that of Wolfman's. The next day, Joe lures Mars to an empty field before attacking him. Tamao and Shibugaki inform Dr. Kawashimo, as Mars resists, injuring Joe's arm further. Joe surrenders and apologizes to Mars, who realizes that Joe needs his electronic brain, and offers to let him take it. Dr. Kawashimo intervenes, explaining electronic brain are vital to a robot's life and it's wrong to give up one's life for another, no matter the circumstances. Wolfman, Bogart, and his gang arrive and challenge Joe to a duel. Due to his injured arm, Wolfman has the upper hand and defeats Joe. An enraged Mars then demolishes Wolfman, Bogart, and his goons. Dr. Kawashimo and Mars take Joe to their home and repair him. Thanking them, Joe leaves, looking forward to start a new life.
22	"An Android's Lullaby"; Transliteration: "Andoroido no komoriuta" (Japanese: アンドロイドの子守唄)	July 21, 1977
Dr. Kawashimo pays his old friend Dr. Tsukioka a visit along with Mars, Miri, and Melchi, where he was requested by Tsukioka to look after his wife, Mayumi, and his son, Takeshi while Tsukioka has to attend an academy conference in America. Tsukioka's younger sister, Hiroko, shows up and offers to look after his wife and son, accusing Kawashimo of being distrustful. When Hiroko tries to take Takeshi, Mayumi instantly becomes overprotective, scaring Hiroko away. Tsukioka then kicks Hiroko out of his house and leaves Kawashimo to look after his family. Kawashimo, Mars, and Miri learn that Mayumi is actually a sophisticated android created by Dr. Tsukioka to take care of Takeshi. After Tsukioka's wife had passed away giving birth to Takeshi, Tsukioka had dedicated his life to creating an android that is capable of raising and protecting his son. However, Mayumi's circuitry is faulty and if it would to go haywire, it would turn her into an unstoppable destructive force, which not even Mars is able to handle. Understandably, Tsukioka doesn't trust his greedy sister, Hiroko, with the task of taking care of his family, so he leaves it up to Kawashimo. Meanwhile, Hiroko hires Acetylene Lamp, now a thug ringleader who happens to be after Tsukioka's wealth, to kidnap Takeshi to obtain most of her brother's fortune. As Tsukioka takes off, his plane suddenly crashed into the ocean after the system was tampered by Lamp, who later captures Mayumi and Takeshi. Mars goes to search for them, but it's far too late. Takeshi was taken away by Hiroko and Lamp, who leaves Mayumi to be beaten by his gangs. Mayumi awakens shortly after in fury, and becomes unstoppable, destroying everything in her path. Luckily, Mars tracks down Hiroko and Lamp, and retrieves Takeshi before letting Melchi beat them to a pulp. After returning her child, Mayumi reverts back to normal and everything settles back down. Tsukioka who somehow survived the plane crash, promises to make some fixes to Mayumi's unstable circuitry.
23	"The Wandering Robot"; Transliteration: "Sasurai no robotto" (Japanese: さすらいのロボット)	July 28, 1977
Mars meets a robot named Adios who is presumed to be working with a robot drug-dealing gang who kidnapped Melchi. After meeting with and fighting Adios, Mars meets a robot who says he's pursuing the gang as well. He brings Mars to the gang's hideout where Adios happens to be. The robot gives Mars a mysterious capsule which Mars ingests, filling him with a ridiculous amount of energy. With this new energy, he faces off against Adios, who almost immediately suspects that Mars has ingested a drug. When Adios reveals this to Mars, it's too late, and the energy has driven Mars mad. Suddenly, Melchi burst out and begins to fight, which breaks Mars out of his drug-fueled madness. Working together with Melchi and Adios, Mars puts a stop to the drug-dealing gang.
24	"Another Miri"; Transliteration: "Mou hitori no Miri" (Japanese: もう一人の美理)	August 18, 1977
A robot named Saromi from Africa comes to visit Dr. Kawashimo's place, begging him to fix the robotic brain of a resistance leader named Dr. Cecimo. Kawashimo does so, but assassins from Africa are sent to put a stop to this. Miri and Saromi set off to find Saromi's ship while Mars looks for and takes care of the Assassins. The assassins find Miri and Saromi, who hold them off for a short time before Mars comes to save them. Dr. Kawashimo gives Saromi a body that was a prototype body for Miri. Saromi heads back off to Africa with the restored Dr. Cecimo.
25	"The Wolf-Boy From Outer Space"; Transliteration: "Uchū no ōkami shōnen" (Japanese: 宇宙の狼少年)	September 1, 1977
During a vacation in the mountains of Nagano Prefecture, Mars befriends a strange boy named Kosaku. Kosaku immediately flees after overhearing the conversations of poacher planning hunt wolves in the mountain. This prompts Mars to search for him and discover that the boy and his family are werewolves who originated from another planet. Nightfall comes and the same poachers begin to hunt the wolves using a giant robot, but Mars puts a stop to them. Unfortunately, Kosaku is the only survivor, but he is determined to live on to honor his family and sees Mars as his friend.
26	"Adios Returns"; Transliteration: "Kaettekita Adiosu" (Japanese: 帰ってきたアディオス)	September 8, 1977
Mars learns that Dr. Kawashimo had designed a robot test dummy built for testing car crashes. Enraged by the revelations, Mars runs away and swears to never return, believing Kawashimo doesn't care about the lives of robots. He wanders through a forest where he reunites with Adios. The two are separated by a collapsed bridge over a ravine. Mars jumps over the ravine and continues onward while Adios pulls back to find another way around. Mars wanders further until he falls into a well, where he's rescued by a robot in a suit of armor. Low on energy, Mars escorts the robot back to his place, a ranch. The robot suddenly springs to life and saps Mars of his energy, removing his helmet and revealing himself to be human. He reveals to Mars that his son had died in a car crash, and he had intentions on remodeling Mars to be like his son. The man invites a shady doctor to his ranch, who almost immediately betrays him by robbing him of his fortune. Right when the shady doctor was about to kill the old man, Adios throws a shuriken at the doctor, knocking the gun out of hand. The doctor makes an escape in a helicopter, but a freshly recharged Mars makes chase and puts a stop to him. After everything is settled, the man apologizes to Mars, and plans to dedicate his life into researching safer cars, offering Mars to stay with him to adopt orphans. Adios replies that Mars has his own family that worries about him. After saying goodbye, Mars and Adios discover that the collapsed bridge from earlier has suddenly been repaired. Mars and Adios cross the bridge and part ways.
27	"The Flight Beyond Tomorrow!"; Transliteration: "Ashita ni mukatte habatake!" (Japanese: 明日に向かって羽ばたけ！)	September 15, 1977
Dr. Kawashimo receives an urgent call from Tawashi about a hijacked plane about to land on the international airport, where the hijackers demand to see Mars. On board, Mars meets Sally, the leader of an orchestra group called The Children of the Republic of Lopras Symphony. Sally and the other children deliver a letter and plead Mars for help in freeing their country. But before Mars can comprehend the gravity of the situation, all the children were knocked out by gas. The following day, Mars meets Lopras, the president of the children's country of the same name, who explains how his country was in a constant state of war, and is finally liberated after the politicians created him to be the robot president. As Tawashi and Mars take Lopras into a room that can withstand a nuclear bomb, they were ambushed by Adios, who demands to speak to Lopras alone. Before Adios can kill Lopras, Mars holds him off allowing Lopras to escape with Tawashi. When questioned by Mars and Kawashimo, Adios reveals Lopras to be a robot dictator, and inside Lopras' body is a 50-megaton atomic bomb. Mars plays the recording he received from Sally, and learns that the dictator had made her life a living nightmare. Moreover, Mars learns that his father, Yamanoue, to be still alive and was the one who told Sally to deliver the message to Mars. That night, Lopras holds Mars' teacher and classmates hostage on his plane, while traveling back to his country. He intends to use this scheme to pressure Dr. Yamanoue to enhance his body, since Yamanoue refused to work for him. Mars confronts Lopras, calling him a coward and telling him that he isn't afraid to risk his life to bring the dictator down. The two engage in a fight, with Melchi and Adios joining in. A defeated Lopras then activates the nuclear bomb in his body as a last resort, but Mars forces him down into the ocean below, sacrificing himself in order to protect everyone. Adios and Melchi discover Mars to still be alive, revealing that he was saved by a nuclear shield circuit that Yamanoue made for him. Mars, along with Melchi, flies beyond the horizon towards the country of Lopras, hoping to liberate the country and find his father.

== Manga adaptation ==
The anime series also was adapted into a few manga issues published as one-shot stories, based on the storylines shown in the anime. They weren't written or illustrated by Osamu Tezuka, but by various licensed artists. The issues are listed as follows:

- Televiland Comics issue

Stories illustrated by Shigeto Ikehara, published monthly in Televiland Magazine throughout the show's run.

- Bōken-ō Manga magazine issue

Illustrated by Rentarō Iwata for the defunct Bōken-ō manga magazine.

- Televi-Magazine issue

Illustrated by Kai Nanase and published in 1977.

- Chū'ichi Jidai magazine story

Illustrated by Saisuke Hiraga, published from April to August 1979. It is a short story divided in five chapters.

== DVD release ==
Jetter Mars was released by Avex on March 27, 2009, as a five-disc DVD box set which contains the complete series.

== Merchandise ==
Several records containing the musical score of Jetter Mars were released during the series run. These are listed as follows:

1. Mars LP Record (マルスのLPレコード, Marusu no LP recōdo)

Jetter Mars' only LP record, it contained several songs along a mini-drama. The songs included in the record:

- Mars, year 2015 (マルス2015年, Marusu 2015 nen)
- Mars' dream (マルスの夢, Marusu no yume)
- Melchi, Let's Bakaruchi (メルチバカルチガンバルチ, Meruchi Bakaruchi Ganbaruchi)
- Goodnight, Mars (おやすみマルス, Oyasumi Marusu)
- Fighting Mars (戦いのマルス, Tatakai no Marusu)
- Boy Mars (少年マルス, Shōnen Marusu)
- Hate! Love! (キライ!スキ!, Kirai! Suki!)
- Wandering robot (さすらいのロボット, Sasurai no robotto)
- The March of Mars (マルスのマーチ, Marusu no Māchi)
- Space Scat (宇宙のスキャット, Uchū no Sukyatto)

2. Single releases

Several records containing single songs were released. These are listed as follows:

- Mars Single Record 1, included the songs:

- Mars, year 2015 (マルス2015年, Marusu 2015 nen)
- Boy Mars (少年マルス, Shōnen Marusu)

- Mars Single Record 2, included the songs:

- Goodnight, Mars (おやすみマルス, Oyasumi Marusu)
- The March of Mars (マルスのマーチ, Marusu no Māchi)

- Mars Single Record 3, a re-release of the first single record, it also included a track containing the sound effects of the anime:

- Mars, year 2015 (マルス2015年, Marusu 2015 nen)
- Boy Mars (少年マルス, Shōnen Marusu)

- Mars Single Record 4, with the same content of single records 1 and 3, except it did not include the sound effects track. It also contained a Drama track, with the voices and sound effects of the first episode of the anime:

- Mars, year 2015 (マルス2015年, Marusu 2015 nen)
- Boy Mars (少年マルス, Shōnen Marusu)
- Drama track: Mars is born, year 2015 (2015年マルス誕生, 2015 nen Marusu tanjō)

- Mars Single Record 5, its contents were practically the same as Single Record 4, only with some editing variations.

- Mars, year 2015 (マルス2015年, Marusu 2015 nen)
- Boy Mars (少年マルス, Shōnen Marusu)
- Drama track: Mars is born (マルス誕生, Marusu tanjō)

- Mars Single Record 6, included the opening and ending songs of the Jetter Mars anime, along the theme song for the anime adaptation of Yumiko Igarashi and Kyoko Mizuki's classic shōjo manga Candy Candy:

- Mars, year 2015 (マルス2015年, Marusu 2015 nen)
- Boy Mars (少年マルス, Shōnen Marusu)
- Candy Candy (キャンディ・キャンディ, Kyandi・Kyandi)
- I love tomorrow (あしたがすき, Ashita ga suki)

== Staff ==
Involved in the production of the series:

Original concept, creator: Osamu Tezuka (手塚治虫)
Planning: Kōji Bessho (Fuji TV), Takeshi Tamiya
In charge of production: Kiyoshi Ono (first season), Kichirō Sugahara (final season)
Music: Nobuyoshi Koshibe
Series composer: Masao Maruyama
Script: Masaki Tsuji, Shunichi Yukimuro, Yoshitaka Suzuki, Masaru Yamamoto, Hiroyuki Hoshiyama
Chief director: Rintarō (りん・たろう)
Producers: Sumiko Chiba, Noboru Ishiguro, Wataru Mizusawa, Masami Hatano, Katsutoshi Sasaki, Yugo Serizawa, Jihiro Taizumi, Rintarō
Character design supervisor: Akio Sugino
Animation supervisors: Akio Sugino, Toshio Mori, Satoshi Jingu, Wataru Mibu, Tsuneo Kashima, Toyō Ashida
Graphic designer: Liang Wei Huang
Art: Shohei Kawamoto, Liang Wei Huang, Tadao Kubota
Photography: Masaaki Sugaya
Editing: Masaaki Hanai
Audio director: Ryōsuke Koide (Arts Pro)
Recording: Hideyuki Tanaka
Production co-operation: Madhouse
Production: Fuji TV, Toei Animation

== See also ==
- List of Osamu Tezuka manga
- List of Osamu Tezuka anime
- Osamu Tezuka's Star System
- Tezuka Award
- Tezuka Osamu Cultural Prize
