= WVLT (AM) =

- Vineland, New Jersey; United States
- Frequency: 1270 kHz
- Branding: 92.9 WVLT

Programming
- Format: Classic hits
- Affiliations: Fox News Radio

Ownership
- Owner: The Voice Radio Network; (The Voice Radio New Jersey, LLC)
- Sister stations: WVLT-FM

History
- First air date: August 19, 1959
- Former call signs: WDVL (1959-1986); WFHM (1986–1990); WMIZ (1990–2026)

Technical information
- Licensing authority: FCC
- Facility ID: 11973
- Class: B
- Power: 360 watts day; 210 watts night
- Transmitter coordinates: 39°29′53.4″N 75°4′29.6″W
- Translator: (92.9 MHz) W225DK (Vineland)

Links
- Public license information: Public file; LMS
- Webcast: Listen live
- Website: www.wvlt.com

WVLT (1270 kHz, "92.9 WVLT") is an AM radio station broadcasting a classic hits format. Licensed to Vineland, New Jersey, United States, the station is owned by The Voice Radio Network.

== History ==
This station, originally known as WDVL, officially signed on the air on August 19, 1959. Initially licensed as a daytimer, the station provided a mix of news, music, and other community-focused programming. Its owners, Mortimer and Vivian Henderickson, were very hands-on in the station's development, with Vivian hosting her own children's segment. The couple sold the station in 1972.

WDVL changed its call letters to WFHM on August 15, 1986, after it and sister station WVLT were sold from Vita Marie and Frank Ventresca to Clear Communications, Inc. The station briefly operated with a talk format. The WMIZ call letters were granted on December 21, 1990, and the station transitioned to full-time Spanish programming.

On October 28, 2026, The Voice Radio Network announced its acquisition of WMIZ and WVLT from Clear Communications, Inc. On November 12, 2026, WMIZ changed its format from Spanish tropical to classic hits, branded as "92.9 WVLT". With the format change, its call sign was switched to WVLT to match the FM station.
