= WVLT-FM =

Radio station in Vineland, New Jersey

Simulcasting WVLT (AM) Vineland
- Vineland, New Jersey; United States
- Broadcast area: Vineland, New Jersey; South Jersey
- Frequency: 92.1 MHz
- Branding: 92.9 WVLT

Programming
- Format: Classic hits
- Affiliations: Fox News Radio

Ownership
- Owner: The Voice Radio Network; (The Voice Radio New Jersey, LLC)
- Sister stations: WVLT

History
- First air date: October 1968
- Former call signs: WDVL-FM (1968–1979); WKQV (1979–1981); WKQV-FM (1981–1986); WVLT (1986–2026)
- Call sign meaning: "We're Vineland's Legend Treasury"

Technical information
- Licensing authority: FCC
- Facility ID: 11974
- Class: A
- ERP: 6,000 watts
- HAAT: 100 meters (330 ft)
- Transmitter coordinates: 39°29′53.4″N 75°4′29.6″W

Links
- Public license information: Public file; LMS
- Webcast: Listen live
- Website: www.wvlt.com

WVLT-FM (92.1 MHz, "92.9 WVLT") is a radio station licensed to Vineland, New Jersey. The station is owned by The Voice Radio Network. It airs a classic hits music format.

== Personalities ==
This station had the call letters WKQV and WKQV-FM in the late 1970s and early 1980s. Call letters were changed to WVLT on August 15, 1986.

"Doo-Wop Diner" host Lou Costello has been on-the-air in the Philadelphia metropolitan area for more than 30 years. In April 2003, he was inducted into the membership of the Broadcast Pioneers of Philadelphia, an organization of 300 area broadcasters, all with at least 15 years experience in the business.

In October 2006, Bill "Wee Willie" Webber joined the WVLT airstaff. In November 2006 Webber was honored as "person of the year" by the Broadcast Pioneers of Philadelphia. Webber worked at WVLT until his death in May 2010, just a few weeks shy of his 81st birthday.

"Crazy Bob" Madara was a former morning drive personality on WVLT.

On week-ends, WVLT primarily carries brokered programming including South Jersey's only Italian-American program that serves the heavily Italian-American population in the Vineland-Hammonton area, hosted by Melissa Cannavo-Marino.

During Hurricane Isaias, WVLT's transmitter was struck by lightning and it caused some damage to the transmitting equipment. It completely damaged the RDS which allows text to be broadcast through the stations signal to display on the radio that receives the signal and it damaged some of the transmitting equipment which caused the signal to become weaker even though it is broadcasting at full power. There is no definitive date on when the equipment will be fully repaired yet.

On October 28, 2026, The Voice Radio Network announced its acquisition of WVLT, along with sister station WMIZ, from Clear Communications, Inc. On November 12, 2026, WVLT changed their format from oldies to classic hits, branded as "92.9 WVLT"; the "92.9" is in reference to the FM translator of WMIZ, which began simulcasting WVLT.
