= Astro Boy (1963 TV series) =

1963 anime television series

- Promotional artwork for the United States broadcast of Astro Boy

鉄腕アトム (Tetsuwan Atomu)
- Genre: Science fiction
- Anime television series
- Directed by: Osamu Tezuka
- Music by: Tatsuo Takai
- Studio: Mushi Production
- Licensed by: Crunchyroll (Note: In North America through Nozomi Entertainment and in Australia through Madman Anime.); NA: NBC Enterprises (TV) (1963–1976); UK: VCI (1985–2000)
- Original network: Fuji TV
- English network: AU: Nine Network, Channel 0 (Victoria only), ABC-TV; UK: Anglia; US: First-run syndication
- Original run: January 1, 1963 – December 31, 1966
- Episodes: 193 (Japanese version); 104 (Dubbed version)
- Anime film

Mighty Atom: The Brave in Space
- Directed by: Rintaro; Yoshitake Suzuki
- Produced by: Koji Bessho; Mori Masaki
- Written by: Eiichi Yamamoto
- Music by: Tatsuo Takai
- Studio: Mushi Production
- Released: July 26, 1964
- Runtime: 87 minutes
- Related works
- Astro Boy; Mighty Atom (1959 TV series); Astro Boy (1980 TV series); Astro Boy (2003 TV series); Astro Boy (film)

Astro Boy (Japanese: 鉄腕アトム, Hepburn: Tetsuwan Atomu; "Mighty Atom", lit. "Iron Arm Atom") is a Japanese anime television series based on Osamu Tezuka's manga of the same name. It premiered on Fuji TV on New Year's Day, 1963 (a Tuesday) and is the first popular animated Japanese television series that embodied the aesthetic that later became familiar worldwide as anime. It lasted for four seasons, with a total of 193 episodes, the final episode presented on a Saturday, New Year's Eve 1966.

At its height it was watched by 40% of the Japanese population who had access to a TV. In 1964, there was a feature-length animated movie called Mighty Atom, the Brave in Space (鉄腕アトム 宇宙の勇者, Tetsuwan Atomu: Uchū no yūsha) released in Japan. It was compiled from three selected episodes from the series—episodes 46 ("The Robot Spaceship"), 56 ("Earth Defense Army") and 71 ("The Last Day of Earth"), respectively. The latter two were filmed and produced in color.

Between 1963 and 1965, 104 episodes were aired in the United States, adapted to the English language. After enjoying success both in Japan and abroad as the first anime to be broadcast overseas, Astro Boy was remade in the 1980s, known in Japan under the name New Mighty Atom, and again in 2003, known in Japan as Astro Boy: Mighty Atom. In English, all 3 series are simply called Astro Boy.

== Plot ==
The first Astro Boy anime is set in the year 2013, rather than 2003 of the original manga. Dr. Tenma, a scientist working in the Ministry of Science's Department of Precision Machinery, loses his only son, Tobio, in a car crash. Out of grief, he orders the production of a "super-robot" in Tobio's likeness. Though the robot is the most advanced anyone has ever seen, he is not pleased with it because it does not grow, and in a fit of rage, he sells it to a circus. After this, he loses his job at the Ministry of Science and rarely appears again. He has a complicated relationship towards robots, mainly believing that they should not be treated as humans but as slaves.

In the circus, where robots exist but are a lot more primitively made than Tobio (now named Atom), they are forced to participate in fighting tournaments similar to gladiator battles. However, Atom wishes to be peaceful. Eventually, he runs into Professor Ochanomizu, the man who succeeded Dr. Tenma at the head of the Ministry of Science; Ochanomizu is treated much differently than Tenma, being regarded as a savior figure by the robots for his affection and kindness towards them that Tenma did not possess. After realising how advanced Atom is compared to the other robots, he sets him free from the circus, becoming a surrogate father figure to him.

== Characters ==
- Atom / Astro Boy, A robot created and modeled upon Dr. Boynton's late son, Astor Boynton. At first, Dr. Boynton enjoyed his company and having his son back, however he rejected the robot after realizing he could not grow up physically like a real human child. With this, the robot Astor was sold to the cruel circus owner, The Great Cacciatore, to perform in a circus and renamed as Astro. After a fire broke out during a circus show, Astro saved Cacciatore and was granted his freedom, due in part by intervention from Dr. Elefun and following the Law of Robotic Rights being passed to grant robots the ability to lead the same lives as humans. Astro has several special powers, such as flying with rockets, super hearing, 100,000 horsepower, superhuman endurance and a machine gun which lies in his backside. In the final episode, which aired only in Japan, Astro sacrifices himself to save the Earth while carrying a shutter which would normalize the sun, which was threatening all life on the planet.
  Astro is voiced by Mari Shimizu with the exception of episodes 97–106 where he is voiced by Kazue Tagami. In English, he was voiced by Billie Lou Watt.
- Professor Ochanomizu / Dr. Packidermus J. Elefun, head of the Ministry of Science after Dr. Boynton resigned. He is Astro's father figure and mentor, and is very supportive of him. He also created a robot family for Astro, including a mother, father, and a robot sister named Uran. Afterward, he reactivated the prototype of Astro, Cobalt, as his brother. Dr. Elefun always stands for robot's rights and does not want Astro to take part in unnecessary battles.
  Ochanomizu is voiced by Hisashi Katsuta. In English, he was voiced by Ray Owens.
- Doctor Umataro Tenma / Dr. Astor Boynton II, former head of the Ministry of Science. He lost his only son, Astor Boynton III, to a deadly traffic accident. Overcome with grief, he vowed to recreate Astor as a great and powerful robot, and used every available resource of the Ministry to create his greatest creation: Astro Boy. Once he activated Astro, he was seemingly mentally better, but grew frustrated with the fact that, as a robot, Astro did not grow physically like a human child. He sold Astro off to a circus owner, the Great Cacciatore, and resigned from the Ministry and was said to have disappeared. However, he has come out of hiding on occasion to assist Astro; one such occasion was to upgrade Astro's systems to allow him to output 1,000,000 horsepower.
  Tenma is voiced by Hisashi Yokomori. In English, he was voiced by Ray Owens.
- Astro Boy's parents, created by Dr. Elefun to make Astro feel more human-like. His mother and father are kind and doting to Astro. They were not part of the cast in the 2003 series.
- Uran / Astro Girl, Astro's younger sister and his most recurring sibling. Uran was given to him as a gift on Astro's birthday. She is often tomboyish and usually gets herself in trouble, like allowing a scientist to give her the ability of splitting in two to both live a normal life with one body and fight in a robot battle arena with another. However, her strength was halved and her other half was destroyed. She is repaired, but no longer had the ability of splitting in two after Dr. Elefun repaired her.
  Uran is voiced first by Yoko Mizugaki, secondly Reiko Mutō, and thirdly Kazuko Yoshikawa. In English, she was voiced by Billie Lou Watt.
- Cobalt / Jetto, Astro's older prototype brother. He was thrown away by Dr. Boynton as scrap for being a failed prototype and reactivated by Dr. Elefun when Astro went missing during a search for a deadly H-bomb. The two found each other deep in the ocean due to transmitting on a common frequency, and Cobalt managed to save his brother from certain destruction.
  Cobalt is voiced by Kiyoshi Komiyama.
- Chiitan, Astro's baby brother (not shown in the English dubbed version). Dr. Elefun had made him alongside other robot babies, but Uran took him as the family's new baby brother.
- Shunsaku "Higeoyaji" Ban / Victor Percival Pompous, Astro's schoolteacher and/or neighbor in the original manga; a private detective and surrogate uncle for Astro in the 1960s TV series. He is voiced first by Masaaki Yajima and secondly by Ayao Wada. In English, he was voiced by Gilbert Mack.
- Shibugaki and Tamao / Dinny and Specs, two of Astro's friends. Tamao is a very good friend for Astro, while Shibugaki is rather a bully who learns of Astro's moral values after some adventures.
- Chief Nakamura / Chief McLaw, Inspector Tawashi's partner who is made for comical relief, he acknowledges Astro's bravery and often tries to defend him from his partner Tawashi, specially when Astro is accused of a crime he did not commit.
  Nakamura is voiced by Shinpei Sakamoto.
- Inspector Tawashi / Inspector Gumshoe, A police inspector who has a huge distaste for robots and does not have much faith in Astro until he manages to prove his worth.
  Tawashi is voiced first by Shingo Kanemoto and secondly by Koichi Chiba.
- Astor Boynton III / Tobio Tenma, the little boy Astro was modeled after, who dies in the first episode.

== Production ==
According to Osamu Tezuka, the main themes of much of the manga he had created, specifically Astro Boy, were that of anti-war, the preservation of nature, and discrimination, which had emanated from his childhood experiencing the devastation of World War II.

Since Mighty Atom ended up being re-written more than ten times, either due to limits on size or duration in the magazines Astro Boy was published in, instead of just simply cutting or scaling down certain parts of the manga, Tezuka would completely redraw certain panels and sections of the manga to fit and flow better with the rest of the story. This means that it is hard to define what the most original, authentic version of the story is. Also, when the manga was to be made into the anime, further revisions had to be made, including a simplifying of the story to suit the less sophisticated, wider target audience the show was aiming to appeal to.

After a while, since the television company that made the series needed an output of fifty-two episodes a year, the anime quickly outpaced the manga, meaning Tezuka also had to create many original stories for the anime series that would not appear in the manga, for the purpose of filling in the gaps.

== Broadcast in Japan ==
The anime was produced by Fuji TV. At that time of production, Fuji TV only had a handful of stations in larger cities before the UHF band was opened for more affiliates, and the Fuji Network System itself was not yet configured. There are many other television stations airing the anime where a Fuji TV affiliate has not yet opened, in most cases, they were the only commercial TV station in that area.

Fukushima Television (which eventually became an FNN affiliate) carried the anime from its inception in April 1963.

== English-language version ==
For the English version, the producers, NBC Enterprises settled on "Astro Boy" after discussions between producer Fred Ladd and representatives from NBC. NBC Enterprises announced that it would begin syndicating 52 episodes on March 12, 1963, and the first episode premiered on September 7, 1963, in the United States. Following the series' success, NBC Enterprises announced it would syndicate an additional 52 episodes on September 16, 1964. The last of these episodes first aired on June 4, 1965, and repeats of the series continued until it was withdrawn by NBC in the early 1970s. A total of 104 episodes were adapted from the first 124 Japanese episodes and changed from their original order. In addition to this, characters' names were adjusted for American audiences. Frederik L. Schodt, who created the English version of the original comic, said that the names were "cleverly" changed for American tastes.

In one Astro Boy manga story Tezuka expressed frustration towards the restrictions passed by American television networks on the adaptation of the newly titled Astro Boy television series. The U.S. version did not air an episode showing a dog being operated on, as the producers believed it was too cruel and grotesque to show. Tezuka criticized this as hypocrisy, as non-Japanese eat and kill animals in manners he described as "grotesque". Tezuka added that many white people in Africa shot animals for sport, yet people in England spread false rumors about Japanese people eating dogs.

From 2007 to 2009, Cartoon Network broadcast and webcast NBC's syndicated edition of the original 1960s episodes as a part of its late night Adult Swim line-up. Only the first 52 episodes were aired.

The Right Stuf International and Madman Entertainment have recently released the entire dubbed series on DVD in two box sets. The Right Stuf sets also include episodes 1, 20, 34, 56, and 193 in Japanese with English subtitles, a behind-the-scenes film, and an interview with Fred Ladd.

For Right Stuf Inc. Home Entertainment's region 1 Ultra Collector's Edition DVD releases of dubbed episodes of the original 1963 series, the original English masters were destroyed in 1975, due to Tezuka's Mushi Productions filing for bankruptcy. Fortunately, Right Stuf found the best surviving voice track elements and combined them with picture quality from the original Japanese negatives.

=== Reception ===
Astro Boy was initially very popular, being the first Japanese animated television series to make it to U.S. televisions, with the highest ratings of any show at the time. However, its popularity eventually declined to the point where only 104 of the 193 original episodes were released in the U.S., the reasons being mainly that it was still in black and white when most television sets were switching to color and many of the storylines were considered too violent and depressing for the mainstream audience.

It was named the 86th best animated series by IGN, calling it the first popular anime television series. In February 2004, Cinefantastique listed the anime as one of the "10 Essential Animations", citing the show's "dark themes and Tezuka's use of sci-fi as a conduit to address such issues as war and intolerance."
