= Go Astro Boy Go! =

Japanese-French animated television series

- Genre: Adventure; Comedy; Superhero fiction
- Created by: Jill Brett; Frédéric Puech; Virgile Trouillot
- Based on: Astro Boy by Osamu Tezuka
- Directed by: Virgile Trouillot
- Composer: Norbert Gilbert
- Countries of origin: France; Japan
- Original languages: English; French; Japanese
- No. of seasons: 1
- No. of episodes: 52

Production
- Executive producers: Yoshihiro Shimizu; Frédéric Puech
- Producer: Yoshimi Suzuki
- Running time: 11 minutes
- Production companies: Tezuka Productions; Planet Nemo

Original release
- Network: TXN (TV Tokyo) (Japan)
- Release: October 3, 2019 – October 1, 2020

Related
- Little Astro Boy

Go Astro Boy Go! (GO!GO!アトム, Go! Go! Atomu; lit. 'Go! Go! Atom') is an animated television spin-off of the Astro Boy franchise created by Osamu Tezuka. Aimed at preschoolers, the series was produced by Planet Nemo and Tezuka Productions.

The series had its global debut in China on MangoTV on August 2, 2019. In Japan, the series premiered on TX Network stations on October 3, 2019.

== Production ==
During the 2014 Annecy International Animated Film Festival, Tezuka Productions announced it was developing new episodes of Little Astro Boy, an earlier iteration of the franchise aimed at preschool audiences. In 2016, it was revealed that this would be an entirely separate production under the same name created with France's Something Big. The series was later re-titled to Go Astro Boy Go! in 2018.

The international version of the show features an intro song composed by Norbert Gilbert and performed by Andy Chase. An instrumental of the track is used for the credits. The Japanese version of the series features a new theme song by Doberman Infinity called by ASTRO BOY ~ GO! GO! Atom ~. The Endless World by Transfer Girls is used for the end credits. On April 2, 2020, the new ending theme was performed by Girls² with a song called Zuttomo Heart Beats.

== Voice cast ==
Character	Japanese	English	Cantonese	French
Astronaut	Kurea Masuda	TBA	TBA	TBA
Astro Boy (Atom)	Romi Park	Kevin Rodriguez	Chan Kam Wan	TBA
Astro Kitty (Atonyan)	Kanae Oki	Shaul Gutierrez	Amanda Shing	TBA
Suzu	Mayuka Nomura	Gabriela Piccoli	Heidy Ling Hei	TBA
Professor Elefun (Professor Ochanomizu)	Yōhei Tadano	Chris Jahn	Ip Chun Shing	TBA
Dr. Blunt (Dr. Brant)	Takeshi Maeda	Roly Gutierrez	Chak Yiu Fai	TBA
Dr. Serene	Kaori Kimura	Lissa Grossman	Yan Wong Yan Yu	TBA
Maurice	TBA	Roly Gutierrez	Roly Gutierrez	TBA
