= Astro Boy =

Japanese manga series

- Eighth tankōbon volume cover of the 1979-81 Osamu Tezuka Manga Complete Works edition, featuring Astro Boy

鉄腕アトム (Tetsuwan Atomu)
- Genre: Adventure; Science fiction; Superhero
- Manga
- Written by: Osamu Tezuka
- Published by: Kobunsha
- English publisher: AUS: Madman Entertainment; JP: Jippi English Comics (bilingual); NA: Dark Horse Comics
- Magazine: Shōnen
- Original run: April 3, 1952 – March 12, 1968
- Volumes: 23
- Adaptations
- Mighty Atom (1959 tokusatsu series); Astro Boy (1963 anime series); Astro Boy (1980 anime series); Astro Boy (2003 anime series); Pluto (2003 manga reinterpretation); Astro Boy (2009 Hong Kong-American CGI animated film); Atom: The Beginning (2014 manga prequel)
- Spin-off
- Little Astro Boy (2014 anime series); Go Astro Boy Go! (2019 French-Japanese animated series)
- icon

Astro Boy, known in Japan as Mighty Atom (Japanese: 鉄腕アトム, Hepburn: Tetsuwan Atomu; lit. 'Iron-Armed Atom'), is a Japanese manga series written and illustrated by Osamu Tezuka. It was serialized in Kobunsha's Shōnen from 1952 to 1968, with its 112 chapters collected in 23 tankōbon volumes by Akita Shoten. Dark Horse Comics published an English translation in 2002. The story follows the eponymous Astro Boy, an android young boy with human emotions who is created by scientist Umataro Tenma in the likeness of his son Tobio after the latter's death in an accident. Eventually, Astro is sold to a robot circus run by ringleader Hamegg, but is saved from his servitude by Professor Ochanomizu. Astro becomes a surrogate son to Ochanomizu who creates a robotic family for Astro and helps him to live a normal life like an average human boy, while accompanying him on his adventures.

The series has been adapted into three anime series produced respectively by the first incarnation of Mushi Production and its direct successor Tezuka Productions, with a fourth in development. The manga was originally adapted for television in 1963 as Astro Boy, the first popular Japanese animated television series, which pioneered and embodied the aesthetics that have characterized anime in general. After enjoying success abroad, Astro Boy was remade in the 1980s as New Mighty Atom, known as Astroboy in other countries, and again in 2003. In November 2007, the titular character was named Japan's envoy for overseas safety.

In 2009, a Hong Kong-American computer-animated film based on the original manga series by Tezuka was released. In March 2015, a trailer was released announcing a new animated series. The success of the manga and anime series led it to becoming a major media franchise consisting of films including a major motion picture, a number of soundtracks and a library of video games. The series was also among the first to embrace mass merchandising, which includes action figures, collectible figurines, food products, clothing, stamps and trading cards. By 2004, the franchise had generated $3 billion in merchandise sales.

Astro Boy is one of the most successful manga and anime franchises in the world and is Tezuka's most famous creation. The combined 23 tankōbon volumes have sold over 100 million copies worldwide, making it Tezuka's best-selling manga and one of the best-selling manga series of all time. The 1963 anime series was also highly successful in Japan and the United States. Astro Boy has been praised for its importance in developing the anime and manga industries. It has been featured on numerous lists of the greatest manga and anime of all time and has inspired numerous manga creators.

== Plot ==
Astro Boy is a science fiction series set in a futuristic world where robots co-exist with humans. Its focus is on the adventures of the titular Astro Boy, sometimes called simply Astro, a powerful android created by the head of the Ministry of Science, Doctor Tenma, known as Dr. Astor Boynton II in the 1960s English dub, Dr. Boynton in the 1980s English dub.

Dr. Tenma created Astro to replace his son Tobio (named 'Astor' in the 1960s English dub, and 'Toby' in both the 1980s English dub and the 2009 film), who was killed in a car accident. In the 2003 anime, Tobio is shown as having run away from home before the accident. In the 2009 film, Toby's death was caused by an incident with the Peacekeeper, a weaponized robot. Dr. Tenma built and adopted Astro in Tobio's memory and treated Astro as lovingly as if he was the real Tobio.

Dr. Tenma soon realized that the little android could not fill the void of his lost son, especially given that Astro could not grow older or express human aesthetics. In one set of panels in the manga, Astro is shown preferring the mechanical shapes of cubes over the organic shapes of flowers. In the original 1960 edition, Tenma rejected Astro and sold him to a cruel circus owner, Hamegg, the Great Cacciatore in the 1960s English dub. In the 1980 edition, Hamegg kidnapped Astro while Tenma was trying to find him.

In the 2009 film, Tenma rejected Astro simply because he could not stop thinking about Toby, but later during the film (and unlike in either the manga or the three anime series), Tenma realized that Astro made credit to replace Tobio. As a result, Tenma decided that he would readopt Astro. None of these events about Astro being rejected (completely or temporarily) or kidnapped in both the 1960 and 1980 anime and in the 2009 film occurred in the 2003, as Astro's birth was given by Professor Ochanomizu (Dr. Elefun in the 1960 and 1980 anime, and in the 2009 film; Dr. O'Shay in the 2003 anime).

After some time, Professor Ochanomizu, the new head of the Ministry of Science, co-head of the Ministry of Science in the 2009 film, notices Astro Boy performing in the circus and convinces Hamegg to turn Astro over to him. (In a retcon, the story becomes far more violent and complex). He then takes Astro in as his own and treats him gently and warmly, becoming his legal guardian. He soon realizes that Astro has superior powers and skills, as well as the ability to experience human emotions.

Astro then is shown fighting crime, evil, and injustice using his seven powers: 100K horsepower strength, jet flight, high intensity lights in his eyes, adjustable hearing, instant language translation, a retractable machine gun in his hips, and a high IQ capable of determining if a person is good or evil. Most of his enemies are robot-hating humans, robots gone berserk, or alien invaders. Almost every story includes a battle involving Astro and other robots. In one manga episode, Astro takes on the US Air Force, and stops it from bombing innocent Vietnamese villagers. This was a time-travel episode, in which Astro went back from the 21st century to 1969.

== Production ==
The Astro Boy series consists of several storylines. In April 1951, Atom, known as Astro Boy or just Astro in English, originally appeared as a supporting character in the Tezuka comic Atom Taishi (Ambassador Atom, sometimes referred to as Captain Atom), which appeared in Shonen, a monthly magazine for boys. Tezuka then created a comic series in which Astro was the main character. According to Schodt, Tezuka created Astro to be a "21st-century reverse-Pinocchio, a nearly perfect robot who strove to become more human and emotive and to serve as an interface between man and machine."

As Tezuka's art style advanced, Astro Boy "became more modern and cute" to appeal to his audience of boys in elementary school. Schodt added that the page layouts used in Astro Boy episodes "became more creative." When designing supporting characters, Tezuka sometimes created characters that were homages to Walt Disney, the creator of Mickey Mouse and Disney Princesses, Max Fleischer, the producer of animated shorts featuring characters such as Koko the Clown, Betty Boop, and Superman, and other American animators. In several of the Astro Boy stories, the first few pages were in color.

Tezuka had a "Star System" of characters, in which characters from his other works played roles in Astro Boy. Similarly, several characters in Astro Boy appear in his other works. Tezuka developed "a type of dialog with his readers", since he developed so many stories during his lifetime. Tezuka also had a habit of introducing nonsensical characters at random moments in order to lighten a scene which was becoming too serious; he sometimes felt trapped by the need to satisfy his young male audience's desire to see battling robots.

Astro Boy was described by Schodt as an "analog", a world where humans and advanced technology coexist. As a result, the plots of the Astro Boy stories often involve issues that stem from this idea. At the time of Astro Boy's creation, Japan did not have the reputation for science and technology that it gained by the late 20th century. This made the "analog" nature of Astro Boy unique.

The manga was originally published by Akita Shoten in tankōbon format; 23 volumes of paperbacks were printed. The stories do not appear in order by publication date, but in the order that Tezuka and the collection editors considered most appropriate. The collection begins with The Birth of Astro Boy, an episode that Tezuka wrote in 1975 to make the collection of stories easier to understand. The first Astro Boy story ever written, first published in April 1951, is in volume 15. Tezuka often re-drew chapters that he had created earlier. Schodt explains that this is the reason some may appear "more modern" than others. For many of his older stories, Tezuka added introductory pages where he himself was portrayed as the narrator. The color pages were reprinted in black and white for the inexpensive paperback versions.

=== English-language versions ===
The Dark Horse English-language version of Astro Boy is an adaptation of the Akita Shoten published works by Osamu Tezuka. The artwork was flipped from the original Japanese version so the books could be read from left to right. Frederik L. Schodt translated the English-language version of Astro Boy and for most of the characters, he used the original Japanese names. Schodt believed that it was necessary to retain the Japanese names wherever possible, as the story was set in Japan. Schodt translated the nickname "Higeoyaji" to "Mr. Mustachio", and decided to use Astro Boy's English name. He explained that "Astro" is close to the Japanese name "Atom", an English word. Schodt believed that using "Atom" in an American edition of the story would be "going too much against the history".

Occasionally, names of Japanese characters had double meanings that were impossible to convey in the Dark Horse English-language translation. Schodt decided that keeping the sound of the names was important, especially when the names were famous. In those cases, Schodt tried to use the double meaning elsewhere in the translation. When dealing with minor foreign characters with humorous-sounding names, Schodt used equivalent English puns wherever it was possible.

The editors of the Dark Horse English-language Astro Boy book did not remove content that could be perceived to be racially insensitive. They explained that in some cases, people may be portrayed differently from how they actually were in 2002, the year of publication of the English version. The editors said that some readers may feel that the portrayals contribute to racial discrimination and, while that was not Tezuka's intent, the issue needed to be explained as some readers may feel offended or insulted by the depictions. They felt that it would be inappropriate to revise the works, because Tezuka had died and there was no way to reverse what he created, and revising his works would violate his right as a creator. They also expressed the belief that editing or stopping publication of the work would "do little" to end racial and ethnic discrimination throughout the world.

== Characters ==
- Mighty Atom / Astro Boy
- Dr. Umatarō Tenma / Dr. Boynton / Dr. Balthus, Astro's father and creator.
- Professor Ochanomizu / Doctor Ochanomizu / Dr. Packidermus J. Elefun, head of the Ministry of Science
- Astro's parents, created by Prof. Ochanomizu in order to make Astro more human-like
- Uran / Astro Girl / Zoran, Astro's younger sister
- Cobalt / Jetto, Astro's younger brother (appears as older brother in the 1960s anime)
- Chi-Tan / Ti-Tan, Astro's baby brother
- Higeoyaji / Mustachio / Shunsaku Ban / Mr. Percival Pompous / Daddy Walrus / Albert Duncan / Wally Kisaragi, Astro's schoolteacher and/or neighbor in the original manga and color 1980 TV series; a private detective and surrogate uncle for Astro in the 1960s TV series
- Shibugaki and Tamao / Dinny and Specs, two of Astro's friends
- Chief Nakamura / Chief McLaw
- Inspector Tawashi / Inspector Gumshoe
- Tobio Tenma / Astor Boynton III/ Toby Boynton / Toby Tenma, the little boy Astro was modeled after, who dies in the beginning of the series
- Atlas, a robot who serves as Astro's nemesis

== Analysis ==
Astro Boy is powered by nuclear energy, embodying both the utopian promise and the potential dangers of atomic power. Atom represents a hopeful vision of nuclear technology as a force for good: peaceful and life-saving, rather than destructive, reflecting the dual legacy of atomic power in postwar Japan. Created shortly after the atomic bombings of Hiroshima and Nagasaki, the series functions as a cultural response to nuclear anxieties. It navigates the tension between the catastrophic reality of nuclear weapons and the futuristic optimism of nuclear energy for humanity's benefit. Atom's "100,000 horsepower" reactor symbolizes this immense, barely manageable power.

== Media ==
The cover for the Astro Boy volume 1 and 2 compilation by Dark Horse Comics

=== Manga ===
The manga was originally published from 1952 to 1968, followed by a newspaper serialization (1967–1969) and two further series in 1972–1973 and 1980–1981.

The original Mighty Atom manga stories were later published in English-language versions by Dark Horse Comics in a translation by Frederik L. Schodt. They followed the television series by keeping the character name as "Astro Boy", the name most familiar to English-speaking audiences, instead of "Mighty Atom." Names of the other characters, such as Doctor Tenma and Professor Ochanomizu, are those of the original Japanese.

Astro Boy, along with some of his supporting characters, appear in a series of "edu-manga" that tell biographies of famous personalities such as Helen Keller, Albert Einstein and Mother Teresa. Astro Boy and his "sister" appear in prologues and epilogues for each story and learn about the famous person from Dr. Ochanomizu, who acts as narrator for each installment. These manga were published by Kodansha, Ltd. from 2000 to 2002, with English-language versions published by Digital Manga Publishing and seeing print from 2003 to 2005.

From 2003 to 2009, Naoki Urasawa wrote the series Pluto, with help from Takashi Nagasaki. It adapts Astro Boy's "The Greatest Robot on Earth" (地上最大のロボット, Chijō Saidai no Robotto) arc (which Urasawa says "has been enshrined as a centerpiece in the literature of our generation") into a murder mystery. In a 2004 manga of Tetsuwan Atom written by Akira Himekawa, the plot, as well as the character designs, loosely followed that of the 2003 anime series. The artwork is quite different from Tezuka's original. This version of the manga was published in English by Chuang Yi and distributed in Australia by Madman Entertainment.

A prequel, Atom: The Beginning began serialization in 2014. It later received an anime adaptation in 2017.

==== Unlicensed comics ====
In 1965, Gold Key published a one-shot comic book, licensed by NBC Enterprises, based on the American version of the original Astro Boy television show. This was done without consent from Osamu Tezuka, who considered the book an unauthorized or "pirate" edition and denounced the publication as "horribly drawn".

Astro Boy also appears in the premium giveaway series, "March of Comics" (#285) also published by Gold Key in 1966.

Editorial Mo.Pa.Sa., an Argentine company, published the comic book series Las Fantásticas Aventuras de Astroboy in the 1970s.

In 1987, the Chicago-based comics publisher NOW Comics issued their own version of Astro Boy, with art done by Canadian artist Ken Steacy, and again done without Tezuka's permission. The series was cancelled in mid-1988.

=== Anime ===
==== 1963 series ====
The first Astro Boy animated television series premiered on Fuji TV on New Year's Day, 1963, and is the first popular animated Japanese television series that embodied the aesthetic that later became familiar worldwide as anime. It lasted for four seasons, with a total of 193 episodes; the final episode premiered on New Year's Eve 1966. At the height of its popularity, it was watched by 40% of the Japanese population who had access to television. Only the first two years of the series, a total of 104 episodes, were dubbed in English and shown in the US. The other 89 episodes were never made available in English.

==== 1980 series ====
A full-colour, second remake of the original manga was produced by Tezuka Productions. The series premiered on NTV, October 1, 1980. At total of 52 episodes were produced and aired. The series was directed by Ishiguro Noboru. The series was released on a 7-disc compilation set by Manga Entertainment on November 22, 2005. A further "Greatest Astro Boy Adventures" DVD was released on July 18, 2006.

==== 2003 series ====
A third series of fifty episodes was produced by Tezuka Productions, Sony Pictures Entertainment Japan, Dentsu, and Fuji Television network. It was created to celebrate the birth date of Astro Boy, and was first broadcast in Japan on the same date as Astro's day of birth in the manga (April 7, 2003) across Animax and Fuji Television. It was directed by Kazuya Konaka and written by Chiaki J. Konaka, with additional writers including Keiichi Hasegawa, Sadayuki Murai, Ai Ohta, Hirotoshi Kobayashi, Kenji Konuta, and Marc Handler.

==== International co-productions ====
At the 2013 Annecy International Animated Film Festival, Tezuka Productions revealed that they were in early negotiations to create local adaptations of Astro Boy with international companies. The furthest along was a partnership with Nigeria's Channels TV, with whom Tezuka was looking to "re-version" the brand with. The project surfaced the following year as the preschool-oriented Little Astro Boy.

During the 2014 Annecy Festival, Tezuka Productions confirmed it was developing more shows. The first, Astro Boy Reboot would be a co-production with France's Caribara Productions and Monaco's Shibuya Productions. It was confirmed that more Little Astro Boy was on the way. In 2022, it was announced that Thomas Astruc, creator of Miraculous: Tales of Ladybug & Cat Noir, would be developing the series along with Method Animation. The series will be 3D, as opposed to 2D as initially planned. At the 2026 Annecy Festival, the release of Astro Boy Reboot was announced for 2027.

The new Little Astro Boy would later be revealed in 2016 as an entirely separate production with France's Planet Nemo. The series was later named to Go Astro Boy Go! before debuting in 2019.

=== Films ===
Astro Boy in the 2009 CGI film

In 1962, MBS released a live-action movie, a compilation film made up of episodes from the 1959–60 live-action TV series that came before the 1960s animated television series and, which loosely followed the manga. The opening sequence, approximately one minute, is animated, and the rest is live-action. The movie was of 75 minute in duration.

Tezuka met Walt Disney at the 1964 World's Fair, at which time Disney said he hoped to "make something just like" Tezuka's Astro Boy. A Japanese IMAX featurette was made in 2005, based on the 2003–2004 anime, titled "Astro Boy vs IGZA", but has only been shown in Japan.

A CGI-animated movie adaptation was released in October 2009 from Imagi Animation Studios. The English version features the voices of Freddie Highmore as Astro Boy and Nicolas Cage as Dr. Tenma. IDW Publishing released a comic book adaptation of the movie to coincide with the film's release in October 2009; both as a four-part mini-series and as a graphic novel.

A live-action Astro Boy movie was announced in 2015, to be produced by animation studio Animal Logic in collaboration with Tezuka Productions and Ranger 7 Films. San Andreas writers Jeremy Passmore and Andre Fabrizio were confirmed to be part of the writing team in 2016. In February 2026, it was announced that Jason Reitman and Gil Kenan are developing a Astro Boy live-action film for Sony Pictures, with the team looking for writers. Later on, it was announced that Sony would not be moving forward with the project.

=== Video games ===
Home Data developed and Konami published their Mighty Atom video game for the Nintendo Famicom in 1988. It is known for its extreme difficulty level attributed to a one-hit death rule.

Banpresto published the Zamuse-developed release of their Mighty Atom for the Super Famicom system in 1994. Like the Konami game, this title follows events in the manga series.

Sega published a pair of games based on Astro Boy. Astro Boy: Omega Factor for the Game Boy Advance drew from various elements from the series, while Astro Boy for the PlayStation 2 was loosely based on the 2003 anime with a slightly darker plot.

Astro Boy: The Video Game is a video game based on the Astro Boy animated feature film from Imagi Animation Studios. It was originally released on October 8, 2009, from D3Publisher for Nintendo's Wii and DS, and Sony Computer Entertainment's PlayStation 2 and PlayStation Portable. It features the voices of Freddie Highmore and Kristen Bell.

Mobile game publisher Animoca developed a series of six Astro Boy themed titles for iOS and Android devices between 2013 and 2016: the endless runner Astro Boy Dash, the musical edutainment application Astro Boy Piano, the shooter Astro Boy Flight, the strategy defense Astro Boy Siege: Alien Attack, the puzzle game crossover Tezuka World: Astro Crunch, and a second endless runner called Astro Boy Zap.

In 2016, Active Gaming Media launched a Kickstarter campaign for Astro Boy: Edge of Time, a digital card game featuring drawings by a number of well known artists. While the campaign failed to reach its $50,000 goal, it was eventually released as a free-to-play title in Japan on DMM.com and on Steam internationally in April and June 2017. The game was shut down on March 29, 2018.

The character has also shown up in video game crossovers alongside Tezuka's other works, including the 2012 Android and iOS mobile game Great Battle! Tezuka All Stars. Astro Boy also appears as a playable character in the crossover puzzle game Crystal Crisis, released by Nicalis in 2019 for the Nintendo Switch and PlayStation 4. Eshigami no Kizuna, a Compile Heart video game that re-imagines Tezuka characters as bishōjo, is scheduled to be released on mobile platforms in 2019.

== Reception and legacy ==
Astro Boy has sold approximately 100 million copies. The series is widely considered one of the greatest manga and anime series of all time. In a 2006 "experts" ranking for the "Greatest Manga of All Time" held by the Japan Media Arts Festival for their 10th anniversary, Astro Boy ranked 6th, the 3rd highest Tezuka manga on the list after Phoenix and Black Jack. In addition, the 1963 anime adaptation ranked 2nd in the "Greatest Anime of All Time" list. In a 2009 poll held by Asahi Shimbun for the "Greatest Shōwa Manga", Astro Boy ranked 5th, the highest ranked Tezuka manga on the list.

Those who have cited Astro Boy as an influence include manga artists Katsuhiro Otomo, Go Nagai, Naoki Urasawa, Akira Toriyama and animation directors Hayao Miyazaki and Yoshiyuki Tomino.

Astro Boy became Tezuka's most famous work. Frederik L. Schodt, the translator of the English-language version of the manga, said it had "extraordinary longevity and appeal across cultures." Schodt said that many of the stories are "sometimes" of "uneven quality." Schodt said that as the time becomes closer to "a true age of robots," Astro Boy assumes more meaning. Jeff Yang of the San Francisco Chronicle, in discussing Schodt's The Astro Boy Essays, said "while kids came for Astro's atomic action – just about every installment included Astro harrowing a fellow robot who'd fallen from digital grace with his fission-powered fists – they stayed for the textured, surprisingly complex stories."

Astro ranked 43rd on Empire magazine's list of "The 50 Greatest Comic Book Characters". The 1960s anime was named the 86th best animated series by IGN, with the publication naming it the first popular anime television series. In TV Asahi's poll of the "Top 100 Anime", Astro Boy came in 23rd.

The 1980s anime was extremely popular in Australia, Canada, and many parts of Asia, with two different English dubs. The dub shown in Australia (and to a lesser extent in the United States) was coordinated by Tezuka Productions and NTV and produced in the U.S. Another dub was produced in Canada solely for broadcast there.

While the 2003 anime did poorly in North America, having received poor distribution and having been heavily edited, including the removal of its orchestrated soundtrack and much of Astro's childlike innocence, it was better received in the UK on the BBC, where it ran for almost three years, as well as other parts of the world such as on the Dubai-based MBC 3.

On April 7, 2003, one day after the premiere of the 2003 anime in Japan, the city of Niiza, Saitama registered the Astro Boy character as a resident to coincide with his birthdate in the manga. That same day, the JR Yamanote Line platform at JR Takadanobaba Station started using the theme music from the TV series to signal the departure of a train. Many lamp posts in the area carry pictures from the TV series, and two large murals depicting Tezuka's works are across the street of JR Takadanobaba station. Later in 2004, the theme music from the TV series was used to signal the departure of a train at JR Niiza Station on the JR Musashino Line.

At Google, the first Android version was internally codenamed Astro Boy.

== See also ==
- List of Osamu Tezuka manga
- List of Osamu Tezuka anime
- Osamu Tezuka's Star System
