= Little Astro Boy =

Japanese anime television series

- Japanese DVD cover

ろぼっとアトム (Robotto Atomu)
- Genre: Action, Adventure, Comedy, Preschool, Science fiction
- Created by: Osamu Tezuka
- Anime television series
- Directed by: Masayoshi Nishida
- Written by: Toru Nozaki; Mayumi Morita
- Music by: Hayata Akashi
- Studio: Tezuka Productions
- Original network: Channels TV
- Original run: March 22, 2014 – April 26, 2014
- Episodes: 8
- Related works
- Astro Boy (manga); Mighty Atom (tokusatsu series); Astro Boy (1963 TV series); Astro Boy (1980 TV series); Astro Boy (2003 TV series); Astro Boy (film)

Little Astro Boy (ろぼっとアトム, Robotto Atomu; lit. 'Robot Atom') is an anime television spin-off series Astro Boy franchise created by Osamu Tezuka. Aimed at preschoolers, the series was produced by Tezuka Productions and Yomiuri TV Enterprise in partnership with Nigerian broadcaster Channels TV.

Consisting of eight 11-minute episodes, the series ran in English on Channels TV's children's block of programming between March 22, 2014, and April 26, 2014. It later received a bilingual DVD release in Japan on November 3, 2015.

== Production ==
At the 2013 Annecy International Animated Film Festival, Tezuka Productions revealed that they were in early negotiations to create local adaptations of Astro Boy with international companies. The furthest along was a partnership with Nigeria's Channels TV, with whom Tezuka were looking to "re-version" the brand with. The international focus, which was made in part as a response to declining birth rates in Japan, was spearheaded by Makoto Tezuka and was hoped to receive funding from the Cool Japan initiative.

The following January, Tezuka Productions officially announced the series. Described as "edutainment" aimed at preschool children, Little Astro Boy was greenlit for 8 episodes with the intention to focus on the lead's innocence, rather than might. While primarily produced by Tezuka in Japan, as part of being an international co-production, three Nigerian animators traveled to Japan to animate two sequences.

== Voice cast ==
Character	Japanese	English
Astro Boy (Atom)	Rie Murakawa	Jennifer Cameron
Pikko	Yuka Nakatsukasa	Chantal Strand
Reggie	Masami Kikuchi	Rogger Harris
Tac	Mayumi Yamaguchi	Ashley Alexander
Kinako	Ai Fukada	Shannon Chan-Kent
Ken	Asami Tano	Erin Mathews
Mitchy	Chuna	Callyn Dorval
Paul	Yuka Terasaki	Erin Mathews
Hamegg	Riki Kitazawa	Cole Howard
Dr. Flau	Tsuyoshi Aoki	Charlie Bostio
Gora	Daisuke Egawa	Adam Fedyk
Pato	Kentaro Tone	Campbell McLoed
Speed Joe	Katsuyuki Konishi	Campbell McLoed

== Episodes ==
No.	English title / Translated title	Original release date
1	"Astro Becomes a Racer"; Transliteration: "Atomu, Rēsā ni Naru!?" (Japanese: アトム、レーサーになる！？)	March 22, 2014
2	"Recycling Gone Wild"; Transliteration: "Bōsō Risaikuru" (Japanese: 暴走リサイクル)	March 22, 2014
3	"Astro Goes to Space"; Transliteration: "Atomu, Uchū e Iku" (Japanese: アトム、宇宙へ行く)	March 29, 2014
4	"We Love Cleaning"; Transliteration: "Osōji Daisuki" (Japanese: おそうじ大好き)	March 29, 2014
5	"Fly! Mitchy"; Transliteration: "Tobe! Mitchy ―" (Japanese: 飛べ！ミッチ―)	April 12, 2014
6	"Heart on Fire"; Transliteration: "Hāto ni hi Ga Tsuita" (Japanese: ハートに火がついた)	April 12, 2014
7	"I'm Moler, You See?"; Transliteration: "O, Oira wa Mōgurāna nda na" (Japanese: オ、オイラはモーグラーなんだな)	April 26, 2014
8	"Astro and The 5 Adventures"; Transliteration: "Jikan o Nusunda Otoko vs Atomu to 5-ri to Bōken-tai" (Japanese: 時間を盗んだ男vsアトムと5人と冒険隊)	April 26, 2014
