= Tezuka Productions =

Japanese media, publishing and animation company

Tezuka Productions Co., Ltd.
- Logo used since 2016
- Native name: 株式会社手塚プロダクション
- Romanized name: Kabushiki-gaisha Tezuka Purodakushon
- Type: Kabushiki gaisha
- Industry: Japanese animation; Publishing; Character licensing
- Founded: January 23, 1968; 58 years ago
- Founder: Osamu Tezuka
- Headquarters: Takadanobaba, Shinjuku, Tokyo (Note: Headquarters), Japan
- Number of locations: Nobitome, Niiza, Saitama Prefecture (Note: Studio), Japan
- Key people: Takayuki Matsutani (Chairman)
- Number of employees: 102
- Subsidiaries: Beijing Xiele Art
- Website: https://tezuka.co.jp/

Tezuka Productions Co., Ltd. (Japanese: 株式会社手塚プロダクション, Hepburn: Kabushiki-gaisha Tezuka Purodakushon) is a Japanese animation studio, publishing, and mass media company founded by Osamu Tezuka in 1968, based in Shinjuku, Tokyo. The company is known for managing, supervising and licensing the intellectual property of Tezuka's works through various business areas such as publishing, animation, films, toys, video games among others. Aside from its licensing business, the company also handles an animation studio in Tezuka's former studio office in Niiza, Saitama and has produced notable works such as Marvelous Melmo, the 1980 and 2003 Astro Boy series, and Black Jack among others.

Astro Boy, the titular character of the media franchise of the same name serves as the company's mascot.

== History ==
In 1961, Osamu Tezuka established Osamu Tezuka Mushi Production as a video and animation production unit. It was officially incorporated as Mushi Productions, the following year. Tezuka served as acting director of the company until 1968, when he left to start another animation studio, Tezuka Productions Co., Ltd., as a spun-off division of Mushi Productions dedicated to manga production and copyright management.

In 1970, Tezuka moved the headquarters of Tezuka Productions to the second and third floors of a cafe business across from Fujimidai Station in Nerima. The second floor was reserved for employee offices and production assistants, while the third floor was Tezuka's own workspace and office. For the first few years, the studio took sub-contracted animation work from Mushi Production, which included a variety of animated shorts and a full television series, Fushigi na Merumo (Marvelous Melmo), which was broadcast by TBS for 26 episodes from October 1971 to March 1972. After Mushi Production filed for bankruptcy in 1973, Tezuka Productions took on animation production full-time along with its manga and copyright businesses and began growing rapidly as an animation studio. In 1976, Tezuka Productions relocated again to the Takadanobaba Seven Building (高田馬場のセブンビル, Takadanobaba no Sebun Biru) in Takadanobaba, Shinjuku.

From 1980 to 1981, Tezuka Productions produced a remake for Astro Boy that ran for 52 episodes on Nippon Television. Tezuka had been dissatisfied with the first Astro Boy series produced at Mushi Production, and had wanted to create a remake for the series since 1974.

In 2007, Tezuka Productions began a multi-year project to digitize and color all of Tezuka's published manga series, comprising over 150,000 pages. Tezuka's former personal assistants reproduced the color charts that they originally used for all-color pieces while Tezuka was still producing series, in order to ensure that the new coloring process remained faithful to the colors used in Tezuka's time.

In 2008, Tezuka's son, Makoto, announced that he would complete Legend of the Forest, his father's final unfinished work, at Tezuka Productions. The film was completed in 2014, premiering at the 2014 Hiroshima International Animation Festival in August, and in North America at the Japan Society in New York City on February 21, 2015.

== Works ==
=== Television series ===
==== Osamu Tezuka Works ====
- Marvelous Melmo (October 3, 1971 – March 26, 1972)
- Astro Boy (October 1, 1980 – December 23, 1981)
- Don Dracula (April 5, 1982 – April 26, 1982)
- Blue Blink (April 7, 1989 – March 16, 1990)
- The New Adventures of Kimba The White Lion (October 12, 1989 – October 11, 1990)
- The Three-Eyed One (October 18, 1990 – September 26, 1991)
- In the Beginning: The Bible Stories (April 1, 1997 – May 9, 1997)
- Astro Boy (April 6, 2003 – March 28, 2004)
- Phoenix (March 21, 2004 – May 4, 2004)
- Black Jack (October 11, 2004 – March 6, 2006)
- Black Jack 21 (April 10, 2006 – September 4, 2006)
- Little Astro Boy (March 22, 2014 – April 26, 2014)
- Young Black Jack (October 1, 2015 – December 17, 2015)
- Dororo (January 7, 2019 – June 24, 2019) - co-produced with MAPPA
- Go Astro Boy Go! (October 3, 2019 – October 1, 2020)
- Astro Boy Reboot (TBA) (co-production with Method Animation and Shibuya Productions)

==== Non-Osamu Tezuka Works ====
- Dear Brother (July 14, 1991 – May 31, 1992)
- Hakugei: Legend of the Moby Dick (April 2, 1997 – May 12, 1999, from episodes 19–26)
- Mokke (October 3, 2007 – March 25, 2008)
- Genji Monogatari Sennenki (January 15, 2009 – March 26, 2009)
- Kids on the Slope (April 12, 2012 – June 28, 2012) - co-produced with MAPPA
- Samurai Warriors (January 11, 2015 – March 29, 2015) - co-produced with TYO Animations
- Dagashi Kashi 2 (January 12, 2018 – March 30, 2018)
- The Quintessential Quintuplets (January 9, 2019 – March 28, 2019)
- Adachi and Shimamura (October 9, 2020 – December 25, 2020)
- How Not to Summon a Demon Lord Ω (April 9, 2021 – June 11, 2021) - co-produced with Okuruto Noboru; Tezuka Productions animated episodes 1, 3–6, and 8–10.
- Girlfriend, Girlfriend (July 3, 2021 – September 18, 2021)
- Muteking the Dancing Hero (October 3, 2021 – December 19, 2021) - co-produced with Tatsunoko Production
- The Dawn of the Witch (April 8, 2022 – July 1, 2022)
- Mamekichi Mameko NEET no Nichijō (October 3, 2022) - aired as a segment of Fuji TV's "POP UP!" TV Program.
- Endo and Kobayashi Live! The Latest on Tsundere Villainess Lieselotte (January 7, 2023 – March 25, 2023)
- My Home Hero (April 2, 2023 – June 18, 2023)
- The Café Terrace and Its Goddesses (April 8, 2023 – September 20, 2024)
- Under Ninja (October 6, 2023 – December 22, 2023)
- The Fable (April 7, 2024 – present)
- My Wife Has No Emotion (July 2, 2024 – September 17, 2024)
- You Can't Be in a Rom-Com with Your Childhood Friends! (January 6, 2026 – March 24, 2026)
- The Cold Sato-san Is Only Sweet to Me (October 6, 2026 – present)
- Rainy Day Serenade (April 2027 – scheduled)
- How Not to Summon a Demon Lord ULT (TBA)

=== Specials ===
==== Osamu Tezuka Works ====
- Okazaki City in 70 Years (March 21 - May 17, 1987)
- Brave Fire S09 (April 29, 1987)
- Tezuka Osamu Academy Grand Prize (December 31, 1999)
- The Last Mystery of the 20th Century (December 5, 2000)
- Black Jack: The 4 Miracles of Life (December 22, 2003)

=== Films ===
==== Osamu Tezuka Works ====
- Once Upon a Time (March 15, 1970) - short film
- Misuke in the Land of Ice (July 1970) - short film
- Misuke in Southern (August 1971) - short film
- One Million-Year Trip: Bander Book (August 27, 1978) - television film
- Unico: Black Cloud, White Feather (April 5, 1979) - short film
- Undersea Super Train: Marine Express (August 26, 1979) - television film
- Phoenix 2772 (March 15, 1980)
- Fumoon (August 31, 1980) - television film
- The Fantastic Adventures of Unico (March 14, 1981) - co-produced with Sanrio and Madhouse
- Bremen 4: Angels in Hell (August 23, 1981) - television film
- Unico in the Island of Magic (July 16, 1983) - co-produced with Sanrio and Madhouse
- A Time Slip of 10,000 Years: Prime Rose (August 21, 1983)
- Jumping (June 1984) - experimental film
- Bagi, the Monster of Mighty Nature (August 19, 1984) - television film
- Broken Down Film (August 15, 1985) - experimental film
- Galaxy Investigation 2100: Border Planet (August 24, 1986) - television film
- Phoenix: Karma Chapter (December 20, 1986) - co-produced with Madhouse
- Push (August 21, 1987) - experimental film
- Muramasa (August 21, 1987) - experimental film
- Legend of the Forest, Part I (December 18, 1987) - experimental film
- Self-Portrait (June 1988) - experimental film
- The Tezuka Osamu Story: I Am Son-goku (August 27, 1989) - television film
- Black Jack: The Movie (November 30, 1996)
- Black Jack: Capital Transfer to Haien (1996) - short film
- Jungle Emperor Leo (August 1, 1997)
- My Son Goku (July 12, 2003)
- Astro Boy: Mighty Atom - Visitor of 100,000 Light Years, IGZA (September 1, 2005)
- Black Jack: The Two Doctors of Darkness (December 17, 2005)
- Dr. Pinoko's Forest Adventure (December 17, 2005) - short film
- Jungle Emperor: The Brave Can Change the Future (September 5, 2009)
- Buddha (May 28, 2011) - co-produced with Toei Animation
- Buddha 2 (February 8, 2014) - co-produced with Toei Animation

==== Non-Osamu Tezuka Works ====
- Thumbelina (March 18, 1978) - co-produced with Toei Animation
- The Life of Budori Gusuko (July 7, 2012)
- My Tyrano: Together, Forever (December 10, 2021)
- My Tyrano II: Easter, Garden (April 25, 2025)

=== Original video animations ===
==== Osamu Tezuka Works ====
- Lion Books (October 10, 1983 – July 16, 1993)
- Love Position - The Legend of Halley (December 16, 1985)
- Phoenix: Yamato Chapter (August 1, 1987) - co-produced with Madhouse
- Phoenix: Space Chapter (December 21, 1987) - co-produced with Madhouse
- Symphonic Poem: Jungle Emperor Leo (April 1, 1991)
- Ambassador Magma (February 21, 1993 – June 21, 1993)
- Black Jack (December 12, 1996 – December 16, 2011)
- Black Jack: The Boy Who Came from the Sky (March 22, 2000)
- Ravex in Tezuka World (November 7, 2009)

==== Non-Osamu Tezuka Works ====
- Golgo 13: Queen Bee (May 21, 1998)
- The Prince of Tennis: Best Games!! (August 24, 2018 – present)

=== Original net animations ===
- Black Jack (2001)
- Pluto (2023) - co-produced with Genco

=== Video games ===
- Astro Boy: Omega Factor (2003)
- Astro Boy (2004)
- Blood Will Tell: Tezuka Osamu's Dororo (2004)
- Astro Boy: The Video Game (2009)
- Astro Boy: Tap Tap Rush (2011)
- Astro Boy Dash (2013)

== See also ==
- Makoto Tezuka
- Osamu Tezuka
- Mushi Production
- List of Osamu Tezuka anime
- List of Osamu Tezuka manga
- Osamu Tezuka's Star System
