= List of Black Jack episodes =

The following is a list of TV episodes and OVAs for the Japanese anime Black Jack produced by Tezuka Productions. The OVAs were directed by Osamu Dezaki, while the television series episodes were directed by Makoto Tezuka and Satoshi Kuwabara respectively.

== List of episodes ==
=== Black Jack OVA series (1993-2011) ===
The first ten Black Jack OVAs were first released between December 12, 1993, and July 25, 2000. Two further episodes were released on December 16, 2011, also referred to as Black Jack and Black Jack Final, based on storyboards and other production work left behind by Osamu Dezaki.

| No. | Title | Manga (Note: Chapters of the manga on which the episodes are based.) | Original release date |
|---|---|---|---|
| 1 | "Clinical Chart 1: Iceberg, Chimaera Man"; Transliteration: "Ryūhyō, kimaira no otoko" (Japanese: カルテ1 流水、キマイラの男) | 119. "Hurricane"; (ハリケーン) | December 12, 1993 |
Black Jack accepts a three million dollar fee from the young and beautiful Sayuri Crossword to treat Manabis Crossword (the Chairman of the Carosan Corporation and Sayuri's husband) on the isolated, windswept Raoski Island. Black Jack arrives to find a frail old man, wracked with painful spasms as all the water drains from his body leaving him weak from dehydration. Eighty doctors could find no cause, but Jack discovers that he has Kimaira, a disease endemic to the island and supposedly dormant for 150 years. However it actually surfaced 60 years earlier, infecting the Crossword family who were all killed by the villagers except the young Manabis. Manabis asks Black Jack to operate on him during a spasm to find the cause of the disease. Black Jack agrees and discovers that the Kimaira virus just as Manabis dies enabling a cure to be developed.
| 2 | "Clinical Chart 2: A Funeral, The Procession Game"; Transliteration: "Sōretsu yūgi" (Japanese: カルテ2 葬列遊戯) | 124. "Your Mistake!"; (きみのミスだ!) | December 21, 1993 |
Six months ago, while in S-city, Black Jack saved Rei Fujinami, one of four girls who is injured while ice skating. Now, during a stop-over in S-city, he encounters the same girl who asks him to treat Yumiko Inoue (Rei's friend) who is in a coma after an 80m fall. Of her other friends, Yuki was killed by a speeding car and Kaori committed suicide 10 days later. Jack examines Yumiko in the wealthy private hospital inherited by Tokio Umetani, although Umetani is more interested in car racing. Jack operates on Yumiko to remove the hematoma on her brain, assisted by the hospital surgical team. Jack discovers that the girls became addicted to mescaline from a small, spiny cactus after finding them growing on Mt. Senin and informs his friend, Police Lt. Takasugi. He accuses Umetani of cultivating the plants and attempting to kill the girls to hide his secret, however they are suddenly interrupted by syndicate operatives who abduct them. They are left on Mt. Senin with the plants ablaze and a ticking time bomb, however Jack just manages to drag himself and Umetani free before the explosion. Later, he bids a fond farewell to Rei and Takasugi.
| 3 | "Clinical Chart 3: Decoration of Maria and Her Comrades"; Transliteration: "Maria-tachi no kunshō" (Japanese: カルテ3 マリア達の勲章) | 152. "The Promise"; (約束) | December 21, 1993 |
The Federal Unites Air Force attacks the Ortega Republic, accusing its leader General Cruz of international criminal activities. Meanwhile, Black Jack is asked by a woman called Maria to operate on an unknown person. During transit, Ortega forces free Cruz, and Captain Maria Carnella is shot in the eye. She contacts Jack who says the patient is Cruz, who is dying from cancer. On the perilous journey back to Ortega, Black Jack operates under moonlight to remove a cancerous lesion on Cruz's thyroid gland to prolong his life. Meanwhile, Federal Unites elite forces attack and the Ortega forces create a diversion, but they are defeated and Maria gives her life to save her father, General Cruz. Jack carries Cruz to the border, but he is killed under orders of Federal Unites President Kelly. Later, back home, Pinoko finds Maria Carnella's dog tags in a drawer.
| 4 | "Clinical Chart 4: Anorexia, The Two Dark Doctors"; Transliteration: "Kyoshoku, futari no kuroi isha" (Japanese: カルテ4 拒食、ふたりの黒い医者) | 056. "Two Dark Doctors" (ふたりの黒い医者) &; 134. "Death of a Movie Star" (あるスターの死) | March 21, 1995 |
Dr. Kiriko is shown to be a doctor who assists his clients to die. Black Jack is called in to help Michelle Rochasse, a movie actress who is visibly undernourished and weak, and unable to eat. After an exhaustive battery of tests Jack cannot identify the cause. Red blotches begin appearing on her skin, and she crashes her car, but she is saved by Dr. Kiriko. Jack examines Michelle and he is told by the film's director that Michelle's childhood friend, his sister Catina, developed similar symptoms before her death. The only common denominator is their childhood village of Anjou. On his way to Anjou Jack encounters the toxicologist, Dr. Kiriko who gives him information about chemical weapons from World War I stored near the village. Jack manages to isolate the parasite responsible and operates to remove it from Michelle's brain, saving her life and enabling her to complete the movie.
| 5 | "Clinical Chart 5: The Owl of San Merida"; Transliteration: "San Merīda no fukurō" (Japanese: カルテ5 サンメリーダの鶚) | 238. "A Passed Moment" (過ぎ去りし一瞬) | May 20, 1995 |
While on vacation, Black Jack comes across a young man called Leslie Harris on a train. Bullet wounds mysteriously appear on his body, bleed, but then disappear. Leslie has recurring dreams of seeing a woman with a child singing about the Owl of San Merida where he finds himself in a battle zone being shot. Black Jack examines him and finds barely visible signs of many earlier operations. They travel to the Republic of El Garnia, a country that endured 25 years of civil war, which ended 4 years earlier, and visit the village of San Merida. Leslie finds it familiar. They meet Ernesto, the only survivor who tells the story of how he, an uncertified doctor, saved a baby by using the blood and body components of the dead woman Sanda, including her bullet-riddled skin. Suddenly the government troops arrive and arrest, then summarily shoot Ernesto for his part in the resistance. Jack is unable to save his life, leaving Leslie the only living survivor of San Merida.
| 6 | "Clinical Chart 6: Night Time Tale in the Snow, Lovelorn Princess"; Transliteration: "Yuki no yoru banashi, Koi hime" (Japanese: カルテ6 雪の夜ばなし、初恋) | 006. "On a Snowy Night" (雪の夜ばなし) | May 21, 1996 |
Black Jack receives a large box of old Japanese currency from Saburo Taneda with an urgent request to treat his dying wife, but the box was sent two years ago. Jack and Pinoko travel to Yashaga Mountain through a snow storm, becoming bogged down. They fall asleep, and when Jack awakes, he sees a temple. He leaves Pinoko with a monk, Lady Kaoru, and continues by foot. He is caught in an ancient battle between the samurai Saburo Taneda and his enemies. Jack meets Princess Ikehata who ate the poisonous gamakazura fruit four years earlier rather than marry Lord Rokuyoji against her will and since then has suffered seizures and violent fits. Abumaru, a messenger from Lady Kaoru, the spurned wife of Lord Rokuyoji, visits Saburo and demands that he surrender Ikehata. Jack operates on the princes to repair an irregular heartbeat, which releases a giant snake. Saburo kills the snake which also causes the death of Lady Kaoru. Following the operation Saburo and Ikehata flee together, but they are killed by Rokuyoji's troops. Meanwhile, Abumaru kills Rokuyoji in revenge for his poor treatment of Kaoru. The storm clears and Jack awakes, realizing that he has had a dream, and he is taken by Saburo to see his sick wife. Jack diagnoses that she has mesothelioma and prepares to take her to the hospital, but surprisingly finds that Saburo died two years earlier, and his wife was cared for by neighbors who resemble Kaoru and Abumaru.
| 7 | "Clinical Chart 7: Black and White"; Transliteration: "Shiroi seigi" (Japanese: カルテ7 白い正義) | 160. "Black and White" (白い正義) | August 21, 1998 |
Yasuhiko Shirabyoshi, the wealthy chief of surgery at the Tozai University is shocked when his fiancée, Catherine, asks for a six month postponement of their wedding because she has volunteered to provide medical assistance for people affected by the civil war in Adentarl. Catherine encounters Jack on her way to a refugee camp, where he searches for a girl called Karen Aramis on behalf of her mother, Saranda and crime boss grandfather Patterson, because she has the hereditary heart ailment, Tetralogy of Fallot. Jack operates on her in a field hospital assisted by Catherine who travels back to New York by helicopter while Jack stays to treat the refugees. He refuses to work in the camp for free and demands one dollar per patient. Meanwhile, the eminent Dr. Stanfield calls together a panel of the International Medical Association (IMA). He proposes that Jack be granted an international medical licence, because he believes that medical ability is not a case of black or white, but Shirabyoshi objects. Jack arrives in New York, and while at a karaoke bar, Patterson is shot and rushed to hospital. Shirabyoshi refuses to allow Jack to operate without a licence and commences surgery to remove the bullets himself. However, Shirabyoshi lacks the practical experience, and he eventually allows Jack to finish the surgery. A month later, the IMA unanimously vote to grant jack a medical licence, but he is not present. Back at home, Jack receives a large package from Adentarl containing many IOUs for one dollar.
| 8 | "Clinical Chart 8: Thoughts For Green"; Transliteration: "Midori no omoi" (Japanese: カルテ8 緑の想い) | 019. "Leaf Buds" (木の芽) &; 125. "The Old Man and the Tree" (老人と木) | October 25, 1999 |
Near the remote village of San Ferna in the Andes, an ancient beech tree is about to be cut down to make way for a highway, but old man Armando protests that it protects the village. Jack receives a telephone request from Andrew, a boy whose brother Lawrence has plants beginning to sprout from his body. Jack and Pinoko travel to the outskirts of London where he examines Lawrence, but finds no clinical explanation for the plant. That night Lawrence disappears and while Jack and Andrew search for him, he appears at Jack's hotel and takes Pinoko with him to the airport from where they fly to San Ferna. Jack and Andrew follow them and reach the boys' parents' house but Lawrence has not arrived. Meanwhile, Armando is camped near the ancient tree and he hears it tell him to find the children. Jack finally finds them, and after a thorough examination he finds that a seed from a beech tree, Fagus Sieboldii, has taken root within his body and is beginning to take control. Jack operates to remove the parasitic plant, and Lawrence begins to recover. On the day the ancient tree is to be felled, Lawrence arrives and sings to it. It flowers, then disperses its seeds before it withers and dies.
| 9 | "Clinical Chart 9: The Carbuncle"; Transliteration: "Jinmen kasa" (Japanese: カルテ9 人面瘡) | 052. "The Face Sore" (人面瘡) | February 25, 2000 |
A street urchin attacks and damages luxury cars, and the case is handed to Takasugi in the Juvenile Division. Investigators find a match between the youth's fingerprints and a woman known as the Love Hotel Killer, who has been killing her clients. Meanwhile, Jack is called to examine Koichiro Tsuzuki, the young head of the Tsuzuki corporation who has developed a large carbuncle-like tumor on his abdomen that resembles a human face. Some nights, he mysteriously disappears for hours. Meanwhile, a beautiful woman calling herself Ryuko seduces and kills men who cheat on their wives. Later, Jack encounters Mariko, a homeless teenager, who asks him to help her wounded friend Ryuko, whom he discovers has a carbuncle similar to that of Koichiro. When Jack returns to the Tsuzuki residence he finds Ryuko there and the carbuncle then changes her back into Koichiro. Jack determines that Koichiro suffers from a dissociative identity disorder and operates to remove the tumor, but during the operation, the personality of Jun, a street urchin, surfaces and he escapes. Suddenly, the police arrive to arrest Koichiro Tsuzuki who has the same fingerprints as the urchin and serial killer on suspicion of the recent murders. Jun attacks the police and is shot, transforming back into Koichiro before dies.
| 10 | "Clinical Chart 10: Sinking Woman"; Transliteration: "Shizumu onna" (Japanese: カルテ10しずむ女) | 036. "Sinking Woman" (しずむ女) | July 25, 2000 |
The D.L. Chemical company is found guilty of poisoning people who ate fish caught in Mikazuki Bay, where its toxic waste had been dumped. It is ordered to pay damages for the many people who have died and suffered various symptoms as a result of heavy metal toxemia. Representatives from D.L. Chemical ask Jack to assist in helping 300 patients urgently needing surgery. Jack and Pinoko stop at a Shinto shrine, which locals call the Mermaid Shrine. It is based on the story of Jiro, a fisherman who fell in love with Nagi, a mermaid. Nagi prayed to the Lord of the Dragon Palace to change her tail into legs so she could be with Jiro. When she dived back into the water to find a blue pearl to demonstrate her love for Jiro, she drowned. Jack and Pinoko stay at an inn and hot springs where they meet Tsukiko, a young woman crippled by the Mikazuki syndrome who sells fish for a living even though the buyers don't eat them. Jack visits Dr. Fox at the hospital to discuss the project, but rumors circulate of an unlicensed doctor on the team, and Jack declines the work. Returning home, Jack sees Tsukiko, who is no longer able to walk and he performs knee replacement surgery. However, Tsukiko misses the sea, and one night she returns to the bay and drowns. When carrying out the autopsy, blue pearls are found in her duodenum, which Jack keeps as a possible key to curing Mikazuki syndrome.
| 11 | "Clinical Chart 11: Visited Memories"; Transliteration: "Otozureta omoide" (Japanese: おとずれた思い出) | 012. "Teratoid Cystoma" (畸形嚢腫) &; 165. "A Visiting Memory" (おとずれた思い出) | December 16, 2011 |
Pinoko suddenly collapses and at the same time, Lady Yurie, head of the highly regarded Saionji family, also collapses while rehearsing a traditional dance. Black Jack can find no cause for Pinoko's ailment, but is intrigued when called on to treat Lady Yurie, from whom Jack removed a Teratoid Cystoma years ago. It is gradually revealed that the cyst was actually Lady Yurie's twin sister, growing within her body. Jack removed the small body parts which he later surgically reassembled to create Pinoko. Jack examines Lady Yurie and finds that she has had recurring malignant tumors, and her body is beginning to fail her. However, she insists on maintaining the family tradition of the head of the Saionji family performing the "Ascent of the White Heron" at the White Heron Temple every ten years. The temple's story tells of a heavenly maiden who took the form of a heron and descended to the land. After falling in love with a human, she gave birth to twins, one of which was slain, and she returned to the heavens with her dead baby. Jack decides to operate and remove Yurie's tumors, but at the same time he transplants part of Pinoko's body into Yurie, believing that the teratoid cystoma was actually creating antibodies to prevent tumors. The operation is successful, and Lady Yurie recovers to perform the dance at the family ceremony.
| 12 | "Clinical Chart 12: The Beautiful Avenger"; Transliteration: "Utsukushiki hōfuku-sha" (Japanese: 美しき報復者) | 004. "Anaphylaxis" (アナフィラキシー) | December 16, 2011 |
A woman collapses on Black Jack's flight to Tokyo and requires immediate emergency treatment. The airplane is redirected to South Korea, but it is a trick, and Jack is abducted and taken to the neighboring country of Anryon. Jack is pressured into treating their leader, General Che Hyoku, who is suffering from a glioma, but he is allergic to common anaesthetics. Jack is also caught in the midst of a violent political struggle for power between the general's militant son Tebyon and a revolutionary group led by his other son, Jongi. After the general hands power to Tebyon, open warfare breaks out. Tebyon orders an attempt on Jack's life but he survives along with Ajun, the beautiful sister of Jongi, with whom he has formed a romantic attachment. Jack decides to use electro-anesthesia to operate on the general and the operation is successful, but when Ajun threatens to kill the general for murdering her parents, he pulls a gun and shoots her. For the first time, Jack regrets saving a patient, and races to take the dying Ajun to the South Korean border, where she dies in his arms.

=== Black Jack: The Boy Who Came from the Sky (2000) ===
This OVA was a standalone 22-minute installment produced as an exclusive supplement for the Black Jack Limited Edition Box gift set on March 22, 2000, the story was based faithfully on the chapter story from the manga titled "The Boy Who Came from the Sky".

| No. | Title | Manga (Note: Chapters of the manga on which the episodes are based.) | Original release date |
|---|---|---|---|
| 1 | "Black Jack: The Boy Who Came from the Sky"; Transliteration: "Black Jack: Sora Kara Kita Kodomo" (Japanese: ブラック・ジャック 空からきた子ども) | 143. "The Boy Who Came from the Sky" (空からきた子ども) | 22 March 2000 |
Escaping from the Berad Republic Air Force with his wife Miguela on a stolen Lepol plane, the former Air Force Major Ivan Juric Gaganoff insists Black Jack to save the life of their son Andrei, whom he has been diagnosed with Eisenmenger's syndrome. After the hardships with Major Gaganoff constantly threatening to kill him if he doesn't cure him, Black Jack, with Pinoko's help, performs the operation on Andrei, attaching his defected blood veins and fusing them with those from his mother; regardless, Gaganoff sacrifices himself after leaving the $2,000,000 he and his wife left him to pay for the surgery, leaving behind a blood-stained cloth on Andrei's hand as a final payoff for the client and blowing himself and the plane up in the process.

=== Black Jack ONA series (2001-2002) ===
These online Flash animation stories of twelve episodes were each closely adapted from a single original manga chapter. Two episodes have never been adapted in any other series: Titles and Carved Seal.

| No. | Title | Manga (Note: Chapters of the manga on which the episodes are based.) | Original release date |
|---|---|---|---|
| 1 | "Where's a Doctor?"; Transliteration: "Isha wa Doko Da!" (Japanese: 医者はどこだ!) | 001. "Is There A Doctor?" (医者はどこだ!) | 1 August 2001 |
| 2 | "Pinoko's Love Story"; Transliteration: "Pinoko rabu sutōrī" (Japanese: ピノコ·ラブストーリー) | 080. "Pinoko Love Story" (ピノコ·ラブストーリー) | 2001 |
| 3 | "Titles"; Transliteration: "Katagaki" (Japanese: 肩書き) | 188. "Titles" (肩書き) | 2001 |
| 4 | "Black Mirror Image"; Transliteration: "Futari no kuroi isha" (Japanese: ふたりの黒い医者) | 056. "Two Dark Doctors" (ふたりの黒い医者) | 2001 |
| 5 | "Hassle Pinoko"; Transliteration: "Hassuru Pinoko" (Japanese: ハッスルピノコ) | 116. "Pinoko's Challenge" (ハッスルピノコ) | 2001 |
| 6 | "Shrinking Bodies"; Transliteration: "Chijimu!!" (Japanese: ちぢむ!!) | 051. "Shrinking" (ちぢむ!!) | 2001 |
| 7 | "The Unfinished House"; Transliteration: "Yarinokoshi no Ie" (Japanese: やり残しの家) | 149. ""The Unfinished House" (やり残しの家) | 2001 |
| 8 | "Star Magnitude Six"; Transliteration: "Rokutōsei" (Japanese: 六等星) | 185. "Star, Magnitude Six" (六等星) | 2001 |
| 9 | "Carved Seal"; Transliteration: "Kokuin" (Japanese: 刻印) | 227. "Imprint" (刻印) | 2001 |
| 10 | "Sometimes Like a Pearl"; Transliteration: "Toki ni wa Shinju no Yō ni" (Japanese: ときには真珠のように) | 029. "Sometimes Like Pearls" (ときには真珠のように) | 2001 |
| 11 | "The Leg of an Ant"; Transliteration: "Ari no ashi" (Japanese: アリの足) | 054. "The Legs of an Ant" (アリの足) | 2001 |
| 12 | "Friendship with a Killer Whale"; Transliteration: "Shachi no Shi" (Japanese: (シャチの詩) | 090. "The Ballad of the Killer Whale" (シャチの詩) | 2001 |

=== Black Jack TV specials (2003) ===
Four Black Jack specials titled The 4 Miracles of Life aired in 2003.

| No. | Title | Manga (Note: Chapters of the manga on which the episodes are based.) | Original release date |
|---|---|---|---|
| 1 | "Where is a Doctor!"; Transliteration: "Isha wa Doko Da!" (Japanese: 医者はどこだ!) | 001. "Is There A Doctor?"; (医者はどこだ!) | 22 December 2003 |
Akudo, the reckless juvenile delinquent son of the billionaire Nikla crashes his sports car while driving dangerously around the streets of the city after cloth from Davy, a young tailor, obscures his windscreen when he has to jump out of the way. Nikla searches the world for a surgeon to save his severely injured son, and eventually hires Black Jack for three billion. Jack advises Nikla that his son can only be saved by using the body parts of a donor, and Nikla has Davy arrested for causing the accident and forces him to be the donor. Two months after the operation, the bandages are removed and Nikla sees is son fully recovered, however a few days later he disappears from the hospital. It is revealed that Jack actually remodelled Davy's face to look like Akudo who had actually died from his injuries. Jack then changes Davy's face again and Jack gives him the money so that he and his mother can leave the country and never have to work again.
| 2 | "The Disowned Son"; Transliteration: "Kandō Musuko" (Japanese: 勘当息子) | 164. "Disowned Son"; (勘当息子) | 22 December 2003 |
Black Jack and Pinoko are sitting in the Tom café where Osamu Tezuka sits drinking coffee and drawing manga. Pinoko drags jack off to Sendai for an operation for the removal of a mole on a rich man's son. On the way, their car breaks down in the snow and they walk to a remote house inhabited by a talkative old woman. She is awaiting a visit from three of her four sons for her birthday, but they all notify her that they cannot come. However, Shiro, the fourth son arrives late, and explains to Jack that he was unwanted, became a delinquent and was disowned by his father, but has since become a doctor. Suddenly his mother falls with abdominal pain which Shiro suspects is long untreated appendicitis, but which Jack believes is "mobile cecum syndrome" and he operates on the old woman with Shiro assisting. They leave quietly the next morning while Shiro plans to stay and open a clinic in the village.
| 3 | "U-18 Already Knew"; Transliteration: "U-18 wa Shitteita" (Japanese: U-18は知っていた) | "U-18 Knew" (U-18は知っていた) | 22 December 2003 |
Dr. Wattman is the creator of the medical program, U-18 which uses computer technology to manage over 900 patients. However U-18 shuts down its operations, stating that it is ill and must be treated by Black Jack within 48 hours or it will terminate life support functions for the patients. Dr. Wattman argues that it is a machine which needs mechanical repair but the computer refuses to accept it. With only minutes to spare before the deadline, Jack arrives by helicopter, and agrees to operate for $10 million. After confirming his identity, U-18 agrees to switch its circuits off so that he can operate. Dr. Wattman tries to decommission U-18, but Jack refuses because it is his patient. After a successful operation, U-18 decides to retire, but Dr. Wattman realizes that the computer has become her daughter and they agree to run the hospital together.
| 4 | "Just Like a Pearl"; Transliteration: "Toki ni wa Shinju no Yō ni" (Japanese: ときには真珠のように) | 029. "Sometimes Like Pearls"; (ときには真珠のように) | 22 December 2003 |
While searching for a knife to cut a cake, Pinoko finds a case containing a scalpel encased in stone. Jack tells her the story of when he received it from Jotaro Honma, the man who saved his life as well as the person who inspired him to become a doctor. Many years earlier, During the operation which saved Jack's life, Honma left a scalpel inside Jack's body, but ignored it for years due overconfidence in his own abilities. During the opportunity of a second surgery, Honma extracted a stick from Jack's body which had secreted calcium to encase the scalpel, much like how an oyster creates a pearl. Honma referred to it as a "miracle of life" but he also questioned whether someone should have control over another human's life. Years later, the ageing Honma slipped into unconsciousness with cerebral softening and a cerebral hemorrhage. Jack decided to operate even though the likelihood of success was low. Ultimately Jack could not save Honma and blamed himself for his death. Back in the present, Jack visits Honma's grave and considers Honma's comment, which he thinks would make it pointless being a doctor. Back on the cape, Black Jack throws the scalpel into the ocean, proclaiming that he is a doctor.

=== Black Jack TV series (2004-2006) ===
Black Jack TV first aired on October 11, 2004, and finished airing on March 6, 2006.

| No. | Title | Manga (Note: Chapters of the manga on which the episodes are based.) | Original release date |
|---|---|---|---|
| 0 | "The Order of Operations"; Transliteration: "Ope no Junban" (Japanese: オペの順番) | 242. "A Question Of Priorities"; (オペの順番) | 11 October 2004 |
A ferry trip goes bad, and Black Jack saves an Iriomote cat, a baby, and a politician, in that order. The politician sues BJ but later has to ask him to save him as he finds he has cancer.
| 1 | "The Vanished Needle"; Transliteration: "Kieta Hari" (Japanese: 消えた針) | 061. "Needle"; (針) | 11 October 2004 |
Pinoko saves Sharaku from Kong, a bully, and they become friends. But Sharaku becomes sick and Black Jack operates on him. During recovery a runaway gurney causes an IV needle to break off in his vein. Black Jack fails to extract the needle, only a miracle can save Sharaku now.
| 2 | "The Ant's Legs"; Transliteration: "Ari no Ashi" (Japanese: アリの足) | 054. "The Legs of an Ant"; (アリの足) | 18 October 2004 |
A handicapped boy is inspired by a book to walk 400km from Hiroshima to Osaka, by himself. Black Jack follows the boy, to his annoyance. Will the boy succeed?
| 3 | "Thieving Dog"; Transliteration: "Hittakuri Inu" (Japanese: ひったくり犬) | 024. "Thieving Dog"; (万引犬) | 17 July 2006 |
Black Jack and Pinoko take in a dog they name Largo. The dog has a habit of stealing things and putting them outside. Inevitably, Largo takes a necklace the doctor received as payment, forcing Black Jack and Pinoko leave the house. An earthquake occurs and both are saved as the dog had detected the catastrophe. ** This episode was postponed from airing due to a major earthquake that occurred shortly before the intended release. Later, it was aired upon cancellation of a baseball game telecast, but was not labeled as "Karte 03" until it aired again in re-runs of the series.
| 4 | "Playing Doctor"; Transliteration: "Oisha san Gokko" (Japanese: お医者さんごっこ) | 159. "Playing Doctor"; (お医者さんごっこ) | 1 November 2004 |
Kong's sister Chako has an unusual case of tuberculosis. Chako, having heard about Black Jack, begs her brother to have him take her case. Kong can't find the doctor, so he gets Keaton from the drama club to pretend to be Black Jack and help raise her spirits. But will it save her?
| 5 | "The Sixth-Magnitude Man"; Transliteration: "Rokutōsei no Otoko" (Japanese: 六等星の男) | 185. "Star, Magnitude Six"; (六等星) | 8 November 2004 |
Black Jack meets Dr. Shiitake, a skilled but unnoticed doctor. He works at Manaka Hospital whose chairman has just died and whose embezzlement case concerning two of their best doctors arrested for bribing doctors to vote for them using hospital money. When a man is injured by fireworks, Black Jack's fee is too much for the hospital, and the underestimated Dr. Shiitake is given the chance to show his real skills. Eventually, he becomes the new director.
| 6 | "A Teacher and a Pupil"; Transliteration: "Aru Kyōshi to Seito" (Japanese: ある教師と生徒) | 034. "Teacher and Pupil"; (ある教師と生徒) | 15 November 2004 |
A boy who is afraid of his teacher, Mr. Muramasa, is hit by a motorcycle when forced to go to school. Muramasa hires Black Jack to save the boy's legs. When the teacher learns of the boy's fear, he leaves the hospital in a daze and is struck by a car. He offers Black Jack his life insurance to pay him for his student's operation, but the doctor saves them both.
| 7 | "White Lion"; Transliteration: "Shiroi Raion" (Japanese: 白いライオン) | 045. "White Lion"; (白いライオン) | 22 November 2004 |
The white lion named Luna Luna, at the local zoo is sick. The lion's keeper begs Black Jack for help, but he refuses. It turns out the lion's illness is caused by a brain tumor which also caused his fur to turn white. After the operation, the now-gold Luna Luna is taken by Black Jack as his fee and released to the wild.
| 8 | "The Miracle Arms"; Transliteration: "Kiseki no Ude" (Japanese: 奇跡の腕) | 049. "Two Loves"; (二つの愛) | 29 November 2004 |
A skilled sushi chef, Taku, wants to make the best sushi in Japan and to feed it to his blind mother. But he is hit by a truck and loses his arms. The truck driver Akira then learns to be Taku's arms and to make sushi. They form an unlikely friend- and partnership, until Akira is then injured with third degree burns when saving a child from a fire. Akira dies in the hospital and tells his wife to give his arms to Taku.
| 9 | "Drawing Water"; Transliteration: "Moraimizu" (Japanese: もらい水) | 223. "Asking For Water"; (もらい水) | 6 December 2004 |
Pinoko and Sharaku befriend an old lady who is staying at her son's hospital. Her doctor son kicked her out of the room she was living in so it can be used by a patient. After being rejected by several friends, she opted to spend a few days at a rundown summer house she owns. But heavy rains cause a mudslide, and Black Jack rescues her. He forces her son to decide what's really important to him.
| 10 | "Legend of the Phoenix"; Transliteration: "Hi no Tori Densetsu" (Japanese: 火の鳥伝説) | 158. "The Phoenix"; (不死鳥) | 13 December 2004 |
Black Jack and Pinoko fly to Asia to treat a 200-year-old man. Miriam, the man's descendant, wants him to live long enough so he can tell her how to find the Phoenix, a glowing bird whose blood supposedly grants everlasting life. Black Jack cures the old man, but the legend turns out to be a hoax. The man gained his long life from sheer will power, and the Phoenix is really just a bird covered in luminescent bacteria.
| 11 | "Gift from a Killer Whale"; Transliteration: "Shachi no Okurimono" (Japanese: シャチの贈りもの) | 090. "The Ballad of the Killer Whale"; (シャチの詩(うた)) | 17 January 2005 |
Black Jack tells Pinoko about how he befriended the killer whale Triton. One day at the beach, Black Jack discovered the injured Triton. He patched him up, and again each time he was injured. Triton is falsely accused of attacking a fisherman, and Black Jack tries to end their friendship, but the whale turns out to be innocent, and Black Jack rescues him just in time.
| 12 | "Give My Brother Back To Me!"; Transliteration: "Niichan o Kaese!" (Japanese: にいちゃんを返せ!) | 059. "I Want My Brother Back!"; (にいちゃんをかえせ！！) | 24 January 2005 |
Pinoko befriends the actor inside a monster suit. The actor has a lymphatic problem that Black Jack treats, but the actor's brother Yukio thinks Black Jack is part of the TV show and has kidnapped his sibling. Pinoko comes up with a plan; the actor "saves" Yukio from Black Jack and they escape.
| 13 | "A Pirate's Arm"; Transliteration: "Kaizoku no Ude" (Japanese: 海賊の腕) | 007. "The Pirate's Arm"; (海賊の腕) | 31 January 2005 |
Ichinoseki is a local star gymnast. He loses an arm to gangrene, and Black Jack replaces it with a metal pincer. Ichinoseki becomes depressed, but his arm talks him into playing competitive shogi. He wins the championship, and the arm turns out to be voiced via transistor by his long-suffering friend Toshie.
| 14 | "Move, Solomon"; Transliteration: "Ugoke Soromon" (Japanese: 動けソロモン) | 225. "Move, Solomon!"; (動けソロモン) | 7 February 2005 |
Pinoko is saved by Musashi, a lifeguard/animator, and becomes interested in his animation work. Musashi wants to make anime that truly appears to live, despite being constantly put down by his successful friend Kojiro. However, when Musashi becomes sick, Black Jack saves him in return for his animation cels.
| 15 | "The Fabricated Wedding"; Transliteration: "Itsuwari no Uedingu" (Japanese: 偽りのウエディング) | 085. "A Transient Love"; (かりそめの愛を) | 14 February 2005 |
Michiru is a teenage girl dying of cancer. Her dying wish is to marry the next man she sees, and in walks Black Jack. After he cures her, she wants to continue the marriage. Black Jack declines and gives her a pep talk about living her new life.
| 16 | "Missing Pinoko"; Transliteration: "Pinoko Yukuefumei" (Japanese: ピノコ行方不明) | 038. "Pinoko Returns"; (ピノコ還る！) | 21 February 2005 |
Pinoko befriends a burglar who has lost his job and family. She goes with him to help him, and they begin a long journey on foot to find his family. However, Black Jack believes Pinoko has been kidnapped, and gives up a chance to have his medical license reinstated in order to search for her. After he and Largo locate them the man takes a tumble off a cliff. Pinoko not only persuades Black Jack to save the man, but also to help him get a job and reunite with his family.
| 17 | "The Idol Who Lost Her Voice"; Transliteration: "Koe o Utta Aidoru" (Japanese: 声を失ったアイドル) | 120. "The Scream"; (悲鳴) | 28 February 2005 |
Rei is the school's star vocalist, until a polyp on her vocal cords causes her to lose her voice. Black Jack operates, but she can't remain silent for two weeks and reinjures her throat. Forced to be silent for three months, she becomes depressed, but befriends Sharaku's sister Wato, and eventually is able to regain her voice.
| 18 | "Mail Friends"; Transliteration: "Mēru no Yūjō" (Japanese: メールの友情) | 082. "Call Sign"; (ハローCQ) | 7 March 2005 |
Although Jun is in wheelchair, he tells his Internet friend Tom he can play baseball. He did this because he was envious of Tom's stories of living on a ranch and helping out with all of the chores there. When Tom is about to visit, Jun asks Black Jack to heal his weak heart. The price is too high, and Jun breaks off his friendship with Tom instead. When Tom finally arrives, Jun learns that he is the young, blind inheritor of a large company. Tom offers to pay Black Jack's fee for healing Jun, at the expense of his own eyesight. Black Jack heals them both.
| 19 | "Good Luck, Kowa Clinic"; Transliteration: "Ganbare, Kowa Iin" (Japanese: がんばれ古和医院) | 100. "Country Clinic"; (古和医院) | 14 March 2005 |
Black Jack is forced to take Pinoko to a local clinic for digestion medicine, and comes to assist Dr. Kowa, a country doctor, in a thyroid operation. Black Jack is extremely impressed by the friendliness and respect Dr. Kowa is treated with by his patients, especially since he can tell Dr. Kowa is an unlicensed doctor. In the end, Dr. Kowa goes back to school.
| 20 | "Tetsu of Yamanote Line"; Transliteration: "Yamanote Sen no Tetsu" (Japanese: 山手線の哲) | 218. "Tetsu of the Yamanote Line"; (山手線の哲) | 21 March 2005 |
Tetsu, the owner of Black Jack's favorite cafe, tells the story of how he was a famous pickpocket chased constantly by a police detective. The detective desperately wanted to catch Tetsu red-handed, but during a chase, Tetsu is injured in an accident involving sheet glass and loses two fingers. The detective blackmails Black Jack into performing surgery to reattach them, hoping to continue as before, but Black Jack covers for Tetsu, and in the episode Tetsu returns the favour when the detective tries to arrest Black Jack for unlicensed practice.
| 21 | "Ice Breaker"; Transliteration: "Haru Ichiban" (Japanese: 春一番) | 167. "The First Storm of Spring"; (春一番) | 11 April 2005 |
Kumiko loses sight in one eye due to glaucoma. Black Jack implants a cornea, and Kumiko starts seeing the donor's last sight; a man reaching towards her. Pinoko thinks the man is a murderer and begins a rescue effort, but it turns out the vision is of the donor's fiancee in his last, desperate attempt to save her.
| 22 | "Pinoko's Plans for Adulthood"; Transliteration: "Pinoko Otona Keikaku" (Japanese: ピノコ大人計画) | 080. "Pinoko Love Story"; (ピノコ・ラブストーリー) | 11 April 2005 |
Pinoko meets Tinq, a boy her age, and tried to have an adult relationship with him, much to Sharaku's horror. Tinq has a strange condition, though; his organs are reversed, and Black Jack with Pinoko's help undertakes an operation to save his life. It turns Pinoko has been trying to make the Doctor jealous, as he is the one she truly loves.
| 23 | "Pouring Rain, then Love"; Transliteration: "Doshaburi Nochi Koi" (Japanese: 土砂降りのち恋) | 179. & 180. "Downpour"; (土砂降り) | 18 April 2005 |
Black Jack meets Kiyomi, a pretty young physician, and the only doctor on her island. Kiyomi falls in love with Black Jack, but he knows he's not worth her giving up her life on the island with so many people depending on her. Then, Kiyomi is injured in a landslide and is saved by Black Jack, only to wake up and find him already gone.
| 24 | "A Challenge Called Nadare"; Transliteration: "Nadare to Iu Chōsen" (Japanese: ナダレという挑戦) | 011. "Nadare"; (ナダレ) | 25 April 2005 |
A genetically-enhanced deer, Nadare, is attacking forest workers. In the past, the deer was befriended by a young doctor and treated as his own sibling. Wishing Nadare was intelligent enough to talk back, the doctor convinces Black Jack to move Nadare's brain from his skull to his chest, allowing it to grow and make him smarter. In the present, the doctor who owned the deer must stop Nadare who, out of control from his own intelligence and emotions, attacks his fiancé. They drive Nadare off, and Black Jack operates to save the woman's life.
| 25 | "The Cholera Epidemic"; Transliteration: "Korera Sawagi" (Japanese: コレラ騒ぎ) | 217. "A Cholera Scare"; (コレラさわぎ) | 2 May 2005 |
Black Jack thinks that he may have cholera, so he quarantines himself, leaving Pinoko to take care of a patient at the clinic for three days. Thinking he is in the clear after the incubation period has passed, Black Jack returns to the clinic and performs an operation, only to become extremely sick in the moments afterward. Black Jack thinks he has cholera after all, but it turns out to be Pinoko's special medicine that caused the symptoms.
| 26 | "Abacus Genius"; Transliteration: "Soroban no Tensai" (Japanese: そろばんの天才) | 074. "Quite A Tongue"; (なんという舌) | 9 May 2005 |
While hearing Pinoko talk about the abacus, Black Jack remembers when the teacher and father of Eiji, a boy, came to see him a long time before. Eiji dreamed of being an abacus champion, but he couldn't move his hands. Black Jack operated to fix them, but when his hands cramp up in a competition, reverts to using the abacus with his tongue.
| 27 | "Tragedy of a High Technology Room"; Transliteration: "Saisentan Rūmu no Higeki" (Japanese: 最先端ルームの悲劇) | 078. "Emergency Shelter"; (地下壕にて) | 16 May 2005 |
Black Jack, Pinoko and several rich men are trapped in an underground, disaster-proof bunker, where the oxygen is being sucked out. BJ breaks through the wall with a scalpel and cuts a wire, finally releasing them when all were on the verge of death. The men had promised him money to free them, then tried to renege. Fortunately, Black Jack has their promise on tape.
| 28 | "Wilderness Epidemic"; Transliteration: "Kōya no Densenbyō" (Japanese: 荒野の伝染病) | 123. "Dingoes"; (ディンゴ) | 23 May 2005 |
Black Jack and Pinoko investigate a mysterious plague in Australia. They become separated; Pinoko befriends an Aussie, Black Jack walks for days. Black Jack contracts the deadly plague, and realizes it is actually a parasite (an Echinococcus, a tapeworm, which causes echinococcosis or hydatid disease). He removes it by performing surgery on himself inside a plastic tent.
| 29 | "Arranging the Flower of Life"; Transliteration: "Inochi o Ikeru Hana" (Japanese: 命を生ける花) | 192. "An Arrangement For Life"; (命を生ける) | 30 May 2005 |
Black Jack takes on a case of Sono, a young girl who is sensitive to light and has a weak heart. Her father wants her to become better at all cost so she can become the head of the family. The family's main focus is ikebana so Sono is pushed to the brink of death to make the ultimate ikebana for her recital. When Sono almost dies trying to go outside to see wildflowers in their natural beauty, Black Jack tells her father she is being pushed too hard. Sono tells Black Jack she will die anyway so why give her the surgery. Hearing this BJ tells Sono that flowers and human are both beautiful because they live. He states he has seen patients far worse than her including Pinoko who struggled so much to live. Black Jack states if she is not interested in living the operation is off. Later Sono states she wants to live and Black Jack goes ahead with the operation lengthening her life.
| 30 | "The Operation at the Thunderstorm"; Transliteration: "Raiun no Naka no Ope" (Japanese: 雷雲の中のオペ) | 121. "Cloudy, Later Fair"; (曇りのち晴れ) | 6 June 2005 |
There is a massive strike of Doctors in a hospital, where a little kid asks a doctor to cure his father but due to the strike the doctor refuses. Then the kid finds a young lady that tries to get help. Finally trying to take the Kid's father to another hospital a thunder makes a tree to fall making impossible to keep going, while they find the doctor who refuses the operation. Black Jack enters in action and decides to operate the sick man in a countdown before a Tree falls on them. A Tree fell on the Doctor and he asks help from Black Jack who says, "Sorry, but I'm on strike starting right now", and after the doctor admits that what he did was wrong, Black Jack agrees to operate on him.
| 31 | "Intimidation in the Twentieth Year"; Transliteration: "Nijūnenme no Anji" (Japanese: 20年目の暗示) | 202. "Suggestion in the 20th Year"; (20年目の暗示) | 13 June 2005 |
While Black Jack was operating on a patient, his hand suddenly became paralyzed and he didn't know why. It was 20 years after Dr. Honma operated on him and he remembers that he blocked his memory about a doctor telling Dr. Honma that the hand of Black Jack will not be able to move after 2 decades.
| 32 | "The Terror of the Azure Sea"; Transliteration: "Aoi Umi no Kyōfu" (Japanese: 青い海の恐怖) | 131. "Fear in Blue"; (青い恐怖) | 20 June 2005 |
Black Jack and Pinoko go to visit a remote island and end up meeting a fisherman and his son. The fisherman wants his son to grow up and go to school, but when his son hears him talking about enrollment he runs away. After hours of searching, Black Jack finds him trapped by a huge clam. attempting to free the boy, Black Jack dives underwater and ends up getting stuck himself. After nearly drowning, Black Jack and the young boy are both free and not badly injured, but in the process Black Jack broke his arm.
| 33 | "An Invader from the Sky"; Transliteration: "Sora kara no Shinryakusha" (Japanese: 空からの侵略者) | 101. "Invader"; (侵略者(インベーダー)) | 27 June 2005 |
A friend of Sharaku witnesses a comet fall from the sky and thinks it is a UFO. Soon he develops a strange lump on his side and is admitted to the hospital. Doctors, nurses and even his own mother has been acting strangely around him... growing paranoid by the minute, he begins to suspect aliens are conducting experiments on him. Black Jack arrives, clears things up and operates on the boy...
| 34 | "Shaky Operating Room"; Transliteration: "Yureru Shujutsushitsu" (Japanese: 揺れる手術室) | 137. "Vibration"; (震動) | 4 July 2005 |
Black Jack visits a neighborhood, where he hopes to get payment for a previous job. However, he instead meets Hotch, a man who constantly complains about the shaking caused by the bullet trains that speed by and literally shake up his neighborhood. Black Jack performs surgery on Hotch's wife, but pauses in the middle to wait for the shaking fit to pass. When he tries to resume again, the train shakes again, until finally Hotch's demands to stop the trains are met and his wife can be saved.
| 35 | "Hijack the Hospital"; Transliteration: "Byoin jakku" (Japanese: 病院ジャック) | 091. "Hospital Jack"; (病院ジャック) | 11 July 2005 |
Black Jack is in the middle of an operation on a young boy when the hospital he is working in is taken over by armed men. They hold the patients and staff of the hospital hostage, threatening to destroy the hospital generator, killing the patients on life support. The leader also forbids Black Jack from continuing the operation, leaving the patient open and dying. One of the doctors recognizes the leader of the terrorists, and reveals that the terrorists son had died in the hospital. In the end, the situation boils over, and the generator is destroyed. Black Jack finishes the boys operation in the dark while the police restore the hospitals generator.
| 36 | "The House on the Cape is Incomplete"; Transliteration: "Misaki no Uchi wa Mikansei" (Japanese: 岬の家は未完成) | 149. "Unfinished House"; (やり残しの家) | 18 July 2005 |
Pinoko becomes frustrated at the poor state of their house and begins pestering Black Jack to move. Black Jack instead tells her the story of the carpenter that had originally built the house. He insisted on being the one to renovate the house into the clinic that Black Jack desired, but ended up becoming the first patient due to leukemia, which at that time was still largely untreatable.
| 37 | "The Dolphin and the Pirates"; Transliteration: "Iruka to Gōtōdan" (Japanese: イルカと強盗団) | 002. "Strangers at Sea"; (海のストレンジャー) | 1 August 2005 |
Black Jack is kidnapped on his way home after a job and forced to operate on a thief who had been injured during a large job. The brother of the wounded man and the third member of the group take Black Jack out to see on a boat, but they become lost. With the wounded brothers condition deteriorating and the third bandit slowly succumbing to madness due to hunger and fear, a dolphin is brought onto the boat. Black Jack saves the dolphins life and lets it go, the dolphin in return guides the boat back to Japan, at the cost of its own life.
| 38 | "A Challenge from the Unknown"; Transliteration: "Mishinaru Mono e no Chōsen" (Japanese: 未知なる者への挑戦) | 211. "A Challenge of the Third Kind"; (未知への挑戦) | 8 August 2005 |
Sharaku, his sister, Black Jack, and Pinoco take a trip to a dig site where Sharaku's father works. They had uncovered ancient ruins. Sharaku's father had called for Black Jack, saying that he felt "compelled to do so." That night, Sharaku takes a staff that was recovered from the dig site and heads deep into the ruins, tailed by Black Jack, Pinoco, and Watou. A monk who was waiting for them in the ruins is mysteriously injured, with several foreign bodies appearing in his body. Sharaku, seemingly possessed, compels Black Jack to save the man. Black Jack is then guided deeper into the ruins where a group of aliens had been hiding. The aliens had been shot at by humans, their medical equipment was destroyed and one of them was in critical condition. The aliens eventually convince Black Jack to start the operation by using telepathy to show him a picture of his mother. In the end, Black Jack and the others agree to keep the whole ordeal a secret.
| 39 | "The War Continues"; Transliteration: "Sensō wa Naomo Tsuzuku" (Japanese: 戦争はなおも続く) | 219. "The War Never Ends"; (戦争はなおも続く) | 15 August 2005 |
Luna, a boy from Iru, is suffering from a spinal cord injury and is slowly becoming paralyzed. Black Jack is called in to perform the operation at the behest of a seemingly inhuman mother who was forcing the boy to get up and walk every night, further injuring him. Black Jack discovers later that the mother had been acting so because she realized the house was under surveillance by the military of the country, which had already executed her husband for speaking against the war.
| 40 | "The Mannequin and the Police"; Transliteration: "Ningyō to Keikan" (Japanese: 人形と警官) | 213. "Mannequin and Officer"; (人形と警官) | 22 August 2005 |
An extremely rigid police officer becomes obsessed with the welfare of a statue in the likeness of a patrol officer and begins taking care of it when a group of thugs that held a vendetta against him began vandalizing the statue. On his day off, the officer stayed hidden near the statue to capture the vandals red handed. He spots them, chases after them, but is seriously injured in an accident. Black Jack, who had encountered the officer before after being accused of running a red light, saves the officers life, and later has the statue repaired.
| 41 | "The Miracle of a Movie and of Operation"; Transliteration: "Ope to Eiga no Kiseki" (Japanese: オペと映画の奇跡) | 153. "There Were Two Films"; (フィルムは二つあった) | 29 August 2005 |
A movie director wants to film an operation by Black Jack to save his son who has a severely compromised immune system due to a congenital disorder. Black Jack is the only one who can even attempt an operation on the very weak boy, and in the end saves the boys life. Although at first the powers that be refused to distribute the movie to other doctors because Black Jack was unlicensed, he reveals that he had made a second version of the film for doctors that made it appear that another doctor performed the miracle surgery.
| 42 | "Life's Wrong Diagnosis"; Transliteration: "Jinsei no Goshin" (Japanese: 人生の誤診) | 043. "A Wrong Diagnosis"; (誤診) | 5 September 2005 |
A doctor who went to the same medical school as Black Jack is now in charge of a hospital. He is quite sure of himself and everyone believes he is a good doctor, save for one young doctor who believes something is wrong with a patient. The head doctor and Black Jack have been invited to a wedding. What should the young doctor do? What will happen to the patient?
| 43 | "Shrinkage!"; Transliteration: "Chijimu" (Japanese: ちぢむ) | 051. "Shrinking"; (ちぢむ！！) | 12 September 2005 |
Black Jack was invited by his former mentor who is doing research in Africa. When he arrived at Africa, he was shocked by the plague that made him bizarre. He didn't leave immediately because he was also infected. He stayed for 27 days, and after waiting for an answer, Black Jack created the cure for the mysterious disease; however, he failed to give it to his mentor....
| 44 | "Pinoko was Born"; Transliteration: "Pinoko Tanjō" (Japanese: ピノコ誕生) | 012. "Teratoid Cystoma"; (畸形嚢種) | 10 October 2005 |
On Pinoko's birthday, Black Jack reminisces of how Pinoko came into his life. On a night some years ago, a group of doctors came to Black Jack with a masked woman who had a Teratoma--a cystic tumor caused when one twin does not develop fully but continues to grow inside the other. The doctors ask BJ to remove it, explaining all other attempts failed when the doctors seemed to go crazy. Intrigued by the 'curse' and how developed the tumor is, BJ agrees to operate but finds himself at the point of his own scalpel as a voice screams not to cut. Assuring the tumor he only intends to remove her, not to kill her, he's permitted to continue the operation, putting the contents in a culture for it to live. With synthetic skin, he fashions a body for her, supplying whatever organs she is missing. Though against his nature, he chooses to raise her, naming her 'Pinoko' and teaching her to walk, speak, etc. He sees a glimmer of himself in her, refusing to help her when she falls and encouraging her to get up on her own, knowing her endurance will make her stronger. A year passes. When the masked woman returns for her final check-up, he has her and Pinoko face each other. The woman is mortified, rejecting Pinoko as her sister. Devastated, Pinoko attacks her, calling her a fool and a murderer, sobbing that she could never understand. The woman quickly takes off, leaving Pinoko behind with Black Jack.
| 45 | "A Classmate who Loves to Laugh"; Transliteration: "Waraijōgo no Dōkyūsei" (Japanese: 笑い上戸の同級生) | 241. "Prone to Laughter"; (笑い上戸) | 17 October 2005 |
In this episode, we take a glimpse into Black Jack's childhood. Kuro Hazama's classmate from middle school, Gerra, loves to laugh. Kuro asks him why he laughs so much and his classmate says it is because he likes being happy and bringing joy to other people. Gerra then tries to encourage Kuro to laugh too. When Kuro visits Gerra's house, he learns that Gerra's parents abandoned him because they couldn't pay their debt. Then goons from the mafia came to his house and stabs Gerra in the neck with a dart. His injury was so severe that Gerra could never laugh again. Kuro promises to be a doctor so that he can cure him. When he comes to check on his friend during his college years, he finds him bedridden and still unable to laugh. Black Jack operates on him and it is successful, until he receives a call informing him that his former classmate has just died laughing.
| 46 | "The Bodyguard at the Festival"; Transliteration: "Bunkasai no Yōjinbō" (Japanese: 文化祭の用心棒) | 103. "Looking Good"; (帰ってきたあいつ) | 24 October 2005 |
The culture festival is here again for many high school. But wait, someone is wrecking them! Jaw a boy who think he is all that. But, He finds out he has a heart problem that will cause his death. He will not able to fight so he decide to protect people and the culture festival till he get better. But will he have a change of heart for others too?
| 47 | "A Violin from a Snowfall"; Transliteration: "Setsugen no Vaiorin" (Japanese: 雪原のヴァイオリン) | 055. "Stradivarius"; (ストラディバリウス) | 31 October 2005 |
The plane Black Jack and Pinoko are on crash lands during a blizzard, balancing precariously at the edge of a loose crevice. The passengers panic until a talented and famous violinist, Morozov calms them with his music. Rescue teams cannot get to them in the snow, so the captain leads them all to a barn 400km away. Because of the wind, passengers are prohibited from taking their luggage, including Black Jack. Morozov stubbornly refuses to leave his violin, tying it to him with his scarf. A passenger sneaks a flask with him, but drops it in the fierce winds. It knocks Pinoko in the head, and her small body is pulled by the storm towards the crevice. Morozov dives to catch her, but his violin is blown away from the effort. Devastated, he tries to reclaim it but is deterred. Black Jack tells him not to go out, warning him of frostbite. Morozov sneaks out in the night anyway. Black Jack finds the violinist unconscious in the blizzard, and his fingers frostbitten. Without his own instruments, Black Jack cannot restore the fingers and must amputate them back at the barn. Morozov comments they both now know not to let go of their most precious possessions.
| 48 | "The Robin and the Boy"; Transliteration: "Komadori no Shōnen" (Japanese: コマドリの少年) | 155. "The Robin and the Boy"; (コマドリと少年) | 7 November 2005 |
Pinoko notices money is mysteriously showing up at Black Jack's home. Soon, Black Jack and Pinoko discover a Japanese robin who is leaving the money, but why? They find out a boy is sick with from tumor, and the robin it trying to save him just like the boy had saved its mate.
| 49 | "The Voice of a Distorted Face"; Transliteration: "Jinmen Sō no Honne" (Japanese: 人面瘡(そう)の本音) | 052. "The Face Sore"; (人面瘡) | 14 November 2005 |
Sharaku scares Pinoko with a story from a horror book. But, there might be some truth behind the story after all. A man with a face wrapped in bandages comes to visit Black Jack. What is he hiding? He has Dissociative Identity Disorder with two personalities. An apparently violent one emerged when his face distorted from a carbuncle. Black Jack operates and restores his face, but it returns. After a second operation, both the carbuncle and personality are gone. Black Jack goes to collect the money, only to find the man waiting to kill him! What is going on? And will Black Jack and Pinoko manage to escape from this crazed man?
| 50 | "The Brothers that were Separated"; Transliteration: "Hiki Sakareta Kyōdai" (Japanese: 引き裂かれた兄弟) | 183. "Younger Brother"; (おとうと) | 21 November 2005 |
Black Jack is hired to act the part of a man's son to operate on his ill older brother. Reluctantly, Black Jack agrees. While waiting to meet with him, the story of the two brothers is told to Black Jack and Pinoko. As a promise to their dying father, the elder brother worked hard to send his younger brother to become a doctor, though he was obviously not cut out for it. Under the pressure, the younger brother ran away and started his own successful company, but his son is revealed to be studying in America to become a doctor. Black Jack refuses to operate immediately, demanding a week to prepare. When the time for the procedure comes, the suspicious elder brother identifies BJ for who he is and stubbornly refuses to be treated, as it is not his nephew. However, Black Jack had already gone and fetched the nephew from New York, and the operation proceeds after the two brothers reconcile.
| 51 | "The Infamous Acupuncturist"; Transliteration: "Uwasa no Zatōishi" (Japanese: 噂の座頭医師) | 126. "The Blind Acupuncturist"; (座頭医師) | 28 November 2005 |
Biwamaru, an acupuncturist, heals people with his needle for no payment, even curing a few of Black Jack's patients, much to the doctor's disgruntlement. He warns Biwamaru not to treat his patients anymore, though Biwamaru replies he goes where his senses tell him. The acupuncturist visits another patient of Black Jack, a young girl, and treats her using a needle and leaves. Black Jack rushes to the girl's house, bringing Biwamaru with him. He shows Biwamaru that the girl has an extreme fear of needles, causing her to have debilitating panic attacks. He treats her, telling Biwamaru that needles aren't always the way to heal patients. Later, Biwamaru returns the favor by using a needle to heal Black Jack's weak intestines.
| 52 | "The Moment of Witness"; Transliteration: "Isshun no Mokugekisha" (Japanese: 一瞬の目撃者) | 044. "Eyewitness"; (目撃者) | 5 December 2005 |
A bomb is detonated in a train station, in which BJ brings support to the injured. The investigation starts. There are four suspicious suspects, who are held for questioning. A young woman who lost her sight due to the bomb is the only witness. Since the eye was destroyed, any operation to restore her sight would only work for five minutes at most. Black Jack agrees to proceed anyway, with the patient's consent. The witness identifies the culprit, who is immediately arrested.
| 53 | "Locker's Cradle"; Transliteration: "Rokkā no Yurikago" (Japanese: ロッカーのゆりかご) | 042. "Baby Blues"; (赤ちゃんのバラード) | 19 December 2005 |
A gang of rough high school girls steal a locker key from a woman on the street. They open the locker expecting something worth money, but find a baby inside instead. The girls panic and decide to leave it there, but the heart of the leader softens and she takes him to be seen by Black Jack when he gets seriously ill. Black Jack treats him, but says he is malnourished and needs to be seen in a hospital. The girl resists and leaves, sneaking out at night to care for the baby, until she is caught by her parents. What will happen to the baby? Did he die? Why did she care so much anyway?
| 54 | "The Fortunes And Misfortunes Of The Deceitful Parent And Child"; Transliteration: "Itsuwari Oyako no Kōun Fuun" (Japanese: 偽り親子の幸運不運) | 097. "A Lucky Man"; (幸運な男) | 16 January 2006 |
A young man goes to a desert and falls to his death, but then returns to Japan a few months later. How can this be? Black Jack changed two peoples' faces and now each is deceiving the other. Will they find out each other's secrets?
| 55 | "The Platform Of Life"; Transliteration: "Inochi no Purattohōmu" (Japanese: 命のプラットホーム) | 212. "A Woman's Case"; (ある女の場合) | 23 January 2006 |
This karte is the tragic life story of a model, how she became trapped in a marriage as somebody's piece of art, escaped but needed to be admitted into a hospital shortly afterwards. She flees from the hospital, fearing that she would be trapped again. Black Jack misses his train, and sees her collapse, he saves her at the train station saying that if she wants to repay him, she should buy him a bowl of ramen. But when she is well, she tells him that because he saved her, she fell in love at the hospital with the man that she married, she offers to pay Black Jack for saving her, but BJ says that he won't accept money from her, even in the size of a bowl of ramen.
| 56 | "The Skin Donor"; Transliteration: "Nuime Hifu no Teikyōsha" (Japanese: 縫い目皮膚の提供者) | 099. "Where art thou, Friend?"; (友よいずこ) | 30 January 2006 |
This is the story of why the piece of skin beside the scar on Black Jack's face is a different colour. Black Jack is in Europe when gets to see his old friend Takashi, Black Jack explains to Pinoco that Takashi was the friend who gave him the most precious gift of all, a piece of his skin.
| 57 | "Pinoko's Exam Diary"; Transliteration: "Pinoko no Ojuken Nikki" (Japanese: ピノコのお受験日記) | 116. "Pinoko's Challenge"; (ハッスル・ピノコ) | 6 February 2006 |
Pinoko wants to get into high school, having received a middle school diploma through a mail-order service. When she goes to apply for the entrance exam, she's laughed off campus due to her young appearance. Finding Pinoko dejected and with the urging of her friends, Black Jack bribes the chairman into letting her take the exam. Sharaku and Watou enthusiastically volunteer to help her study, but Black Jack warns them not to push her too hard as her synthetic body tires as easily as a child's. Pinoko studies hard and gets to the exam, but collapses with severe stomach pain. Black Jack operates on her, confirming his suspicions that her body can't handle the stress that comes with a competitive high school environment. Pinoko then decides she'll try kindergarten next, but proves to be a bit too rambunctious for the little tykes.
| 58 | "The Old Man And The Big Tree"; Transliteration: "Rōjin to Taiboku" (Japanese: 老人と大木) | 125. "The Old Man and the Tree"; (老人と木) | 13 February 2006 |
There is a very old tree in a park in the next town, to which Pinoko and the others discover. This karte is about their attempts to protect this old tree and the life of the old man.
| 59 | "Black Queen"; Transliteration: "Burakku Kwīn" (Japanese: ブラッククィーン) | 057. "Black Queen"; (ブラック・クイーン) | 20 February 2006 |
This karte is about a female surgeon, the rumours say she is as cold as ice, that she is like a female Black Jack, thus the nickname she received at her hospital; Black Queen.
| 60 | "The Encounter Between The Two With A Past"; Transliteration: "Kako no aru Futari Meguriai" (Japanese: 過去のある二人めぐり逢い) | 234. "Accident"; (再会) | 27 February 2006 |
This karte is about two people, how their fates became intertwined when Black Jack saved the life one of the two.
| 61 | "The Two Pinokos"; Transliteration: "Futari no Pinoko" (Japanese: 二人のピノコ) | 067. "The Two Pinokos"; (ふたりのピノコ) | 6 March 2006 |
Black Jack has a job in a small town near a factory, and tells Pinoko she has to stay home because of her bad cold. While on his way to his hotel, he meets a young girl who looks almost identical to Pinoco. How could this be? And she has a fatal lung disease, too.
| Special–Karte | "Kamaitachi In The Woodlands"; Transliteration: "Jukai no Kamaitachi" (Japanese: 樹海のかまいたち) | 181. "Random Killer"; (通り魔) | 17 July 2006 |
Something is randomly slashing people in the woods, leaving no trace. When Dr. Clonen is hit by one of these slashes, Black Jack tries to save him only to be mistaken for the murderer. Now Black Jack and Pinoko have to run from the police while figuring out who—or what—is causing these incidents. ** Aired alongside "Karte 03: Thieving Dog" as part of a special.

=== Black Jack 21 TV series (2006) ===
Black Jack 21 first aired on April 10, 2006, and finished airing on September 4, 2006.

| No. | Title | Manga (Note: Chapters of the manga on which the episodes are based.) | Original release date |
|---|---|---|---|
| 1 | "The Day His Medical License Returns"; Transliteration: "Ishimenkyo ga kaeruhi" (Japanese: 医師免許が返る日) | 088. "Revenge" (報復) &; 033. "Lion-Face Disease" (獅子面病) | 10 April 2006 |
Black Jack is given a chance to redeem his medical license, by treating the son of Detective Takasugi who has Paget's Disease. The operation is a success, but Jack refuses to comply with the bureaucratic registration process and is arrested for practicing without a licence. During Black Jack's imprisonment, a former patient, the Italian billionaire Mr. Boccherini, begs Black Jack to save his grandson, but the head of the Japan Medical Association refuses to release Black Jack despite the billionaire's attempts at bribery. The operation is assigned to Dr. White who carries it out using robotic surgical aids. Boccherini tells Jack of the boy's miraculous recovery, but Black Jack suspects that the dramatic recovery is too radical and the boy later dies. Enraged at the death of his grandson, the billionaire arranges for the son of the head of the medical association to be shot. The father pleads with Jack to save the boy and he agrees, but for an outrageous sum of money.
| 2 | "BJ Reunites With His Father"; Transliteration: "BJ chichioya tono saikai" (Japanese: Black Jack父親との再会) | 068. "The Mask Chosen"; (選ばれたマスク) | 17 April 2006 |
Black Jack, still holds a grudge against his father for walking out on him and his mother Mio after they were caught in an explosion. However, he responds when his wealthy father, Kagemitsu Hazama, contacts him for the first time in 21 years. Kagemitsu offers money and a partnership in his syndicate if Jack will perform plastic surgery on his second wife, Renka, who was burned in a fire. His father instructs Jack to make her "The most beautiful woman alive". When the bandages are removed, his father is horrified to find that she looks exactly like his late wife, Mio. After Jack arrives back at his house, he is the target of an assassination attempt by a mysterious organization and is caught in a massive explosion.
| 3 | "Pinoko in Sorrow (Pinoko Again)"; Transliteration: "Kanashimi no Pinoko" (Japanese: 悲しみのピノコ) | 016. "Pinoko is Adopted"; (ピノコ再び) | 24 April 2006 |
Pinoko, refuses to believe that Black Jack is dead and continues to dig through the rubble of their bombed out house. For a while, she lives in the diner owned by Jack's friend Tetsu, but later reluctantly agrees to be adopted by a family that runs a local hospital. It is then revealed that Black Jack survived the bomb blast set by the assassin Benitokage, thanks to help from his friends, Toriton the killer whale and the father and son fishermen. Jack remains in hiding to prevent placing Pinoko and his friends in danger, and suspects that the bomb is similar to the one which almost killed him 21 years ago. During his investigations, Jack discovers an old group photograph in the clinic once owned by Dr. Honma, Black Jack's mentor, which includes Dr. Honma, Dr. Kreutuzer and his father. After Pinoko finds him, Jack comes out of hiding to continue his search for the assassins.
| 4 | "The Black Angel of Northern Europe" (Japanese: 北欧の黒い天使!) | 230. "The Substitute"; (身代わり) | 8 May 2006 |
Black Jack and Pinoko fly to Europe to track down Dr Kreutzer, a man that Jack recognized in the photograph he found at Honma's clinic. While at a hospital run by Dr. Kreutuzer, Jack befriends a little girl named Suzie. He enters the hospital where he finds that Dr. Kreutzer has been in a persistent vegetative state for two months after a car accident. The hospital controller, Mr. Devon, asks Jack to impersonate Dr. Kreutuzer and perform an operation on a cancer patient. At first Jack refuses, although he later accepts the job for a high fee after Pinoko reveals that the patient is the little girl's mother. Following the operation, a Dr. Stein who was also present in the old group photograph mentions the "organization" and the "Noir Project".
| 5 | "The Robotic Arm" (Japanese: ロボットの腕) | 151. "Hospital"; (ホスピタル) | 15 May 2006 |
After encountering Dr. Stein at Kreutzer's hospital, Black Jack follows Dr. Stein to his hospital in Germany where he is a leading expert on prosthetic limbs and organ transplants. Jack encounters a colleague, Dr. Konomi Kuwata (a.k.a. Black Queen) who mentions that Dr. Stein is about to perform an operation that would attach an experimental robotic arm to the boy Triton, an aspiring pianist who has Ewing's sarcoma. Jack fails to get any answers from Dr. Stein, but he does talk to the boy who would rather keep his human arm and learn to play the hard way. With Dr. Kuwata's assistance, Jack saves the boy's arm, and then plans to follow Dr. Stein to England. Meanwhile, Benitokage and the organization's assassins are still hot on his heels.
| 6 | "The Flying Hospital" (Japanese: 空飛ぶ病院) | 196. "Cancer Hunter"; (腫瘍狩り) | 22 May 2006 |
With the help of Dr. Ayako Nishikawa whom he met during his encounter with Dr. White, Black Jack is offered a lift to England by riding in the Sky Hospital owned by Dr. White, a military aircraft converted into a fully functioning airborne clinic. During the flight, a group of militants hijack the plane, planning to turn it back into a fighting craft to help their own people in Taranistan. The passengers and crew of the plane resist the terrorists, but one of the militants detonates a stun grenade in the cockpit, injuring the pilots and himself with shrapnel. Jack operates to save the lives of the injured under almost impossible conditions while Dr. White struggles to control the damaged Sky Hospital as it runs low on fuel. With the assistance of a semi-recovered pilot, Dr. White safely lands the plane in a desert. Jack and Pinoko continue their journey on foot.
| 7 | "The Promise Concerning Life, Worth Ten Billion Yen" (Japanese: 百億円 命の約束) | 201. "Helping Each Other"; (助けあい) | 29 May 2006 |
Black Jack and Pinoco arrive in a middle eastern town after leaving the damaged Sky Hospital. While there, they befriend a Japanese man named Aritani who is there on business. Later that night Black Jack is arrested and accused of murder, but Pinoko finds Aritani who provides an alibi for him. Jack offers to repay the favor with a free treatment if ever required. Later, Aritani returns to his office in Germany where he is pressured to take the fall for his company which was redirecting money illegally to an unknown organization. However, after taking responsibility for the missing funds, Aritani is thrown in front of a train and ends up in a critical condition. Desperate to save Aritani's life, Jack races to Germany but is unable to operate on Aritani without a licence. After he inspires the owner of the hospital with his determination, Jack temporarily buys the hospital and saves Aritani. After he recovers, Aritani says the redirected money was used to fund the Noir Project.
| 8 | "Awake After Sixty-Five Years"; Transliteration: "65nen me no mezame" (Japanese: 65年目の目覚め) | 106. "Urashima"; (浦島太郎) | 5 June 2006 |
Black Jack finally arrives in England searching for Dr. Stein when he hears of a man who's been in a coma for 65 years but has not aged. Dr. Stein wants to analyse him seeking information about eternal youth, however the patient's niece has hired Dr. Kiriko to end his life. Instead, Jack successfully operates on the patient who regains consciousness, but begins ageing rapidly and dies. Shortly afterwards Dr. Stein tell jack that it was him who urged Dr. Honma to try organ transplants on Jack 21 years ago after he was severely injured in an explosion. As Dr. Stein dies from a curious ailment called "Phoenix disease" he gives Jack the name of Dr. Jorujyu, currently in New York, who was also in the old group photograph and who may be able to help Jack with his quest.
| 9 | "The Imprint on the Heart" (Japanese: 心臓(ハート)の刻印) | 163. "Honma's Hematoma"; (本間血腫) | 12 June 2006 |
Black Jack and Pinoko travel to New York. Dr. Bart, now the head at Dr. Jorujyu's hospital, asks Jack to help him operate on his mother, Catherine Bart, because she has Honma's Hematoma. Jack, remembers his mentor's words not to get involved in that disease and refuses. Years earlier, the medical community accused Dr. Honma of conducting a live experiment on a patient with the rare disease causing him to resign. Later, Jack locates the clock which appears in the old group photograph just as Benitokage, the female assassin, arrives up and shoots Jack in the chest. Following the shooting, she is ordered to retrieve something from Catherine Bart.
| 10 | "A Miracle in New York" (Japanese: 紐育(ニューヨーク)の奇跡) | 193. "Recollections of a Spinster"; (ある老婆の思い出) | 26 June 2006 |
Black Jack survives the shooting because his mother's pendant stopped the bullet. He operates on Dr. Bart's mother, Catherine, and discovers that she has a Type Hydra artificial heart which keeps beating even when it is extracted from the host. Jack replaces the Type Hydra with another artificial heart and saves her life. They discover that the Type Hydra was designed by Jack's father, Hazama Kagemitsu, through a microfiche that was inside Mio's pendant. Catherine tells Jack how his parents met and how Kagemitsu left Mio and the hospital to work on the Noir Project. When Catherine had a heart attack, Kagemitsu risked his life to provide the experimental the artificial heart. Meanwhile, Benitokage steals the Type Hydra and the order to kill Jack is cancelled.
| 11 | "The Destiny of the Black Doctor" (Japanese: 黒い医者の宿命) | 079. "There was a Valve!"; (弁があった!) | 3 July 2006 |
Black Jack and Pinoko travel to Canada and arrive at Dr. Jorujyu's lakeside cabin. Jack is shot at by the doctor's daughter Yuri, mistaking him for her brother. Dr. Georges is seriously ill, and Black Jack diagnoses that he has mediastinal pneumonthorax causing air to leak into a body cavity. Yuri's brother arrives, and is he none other than the infamous Dr. Kiriko, who has been unable to save his father and plans to euthanize him against his sister's wishes. Dr. Kiriko reveals that his father also has the incurable Phoenix Disease, contracted during the Noir Project which was seeking the secret of eternal life. Jack successfully operates on Dr. Jorujyu who temporarily regains consciousness, but he succumbs to the incurable disease anyway. As Jack leaves, Yuri gives Jack the key to her father's research laboratory.
| 12 | "Beyond the Aura" (Japanese: オーロラの彼方に) | 129. "A Visit From a Killer"; (殺しがやってくる) | 10 July 2006 |
Black Jack and Pinoco travel by train to find Dr. Jorujyu's research lab however, Benitokage continues to pursue him with her henchman Souryu. Benitokage tracks them through the snow, but during a violent confrontation she is injured and Jack decides to rescue her and treat her wounds. In Dr. Jorujyu's cottage cellar, Jack finally stumbles across a document about the mysterious Phoenix disease. The weather worsens with a heavy blizzard as Benitokage regains conscious. She takes Pinoco hostage and attempts to kill Jack again, but she fails then tries to kill herself. Jack saves her life again, but an avalanche approaches the cabin. The three of them hide in the cellar, but the document about the Phoenix disease is lost when the cabin above them is destroyed. Later, they are rescued by Souryu, and Benitokage decides to help Jack, telling him that one of the men in the group photograph is Dr. Kuma who lives somewhere in the Gabonese Republic in Africa.
| 13 | "Pinoko go Back to Japan" (Japanese: ピノコ、日本へ帰れ!) | 013. "Pinoko Loves You"; (ピノコ愛してる) | 24 July 2006 |
Ten years ago in Africa, the twins Niko and Al were orphaned by floods, but only Niko is adopted. In the present, Black Jack and Pinoko arrive in Africa searching for Dr. Kuma and encounter Sharaku and his father. Jack is concerned with Pinoko's safety and requests that Sharaku's father send her back to Japan with Sharaku which devastates Pinoko. In the street, Pinoko meets a Al who is now a grocery boy and later encounters his twin brother Niko who is caring for is adopted mother. Her son was killed in the same flood, and Niko was raised as her son Johan to give her the will to live. Meanwhile, Al falls ill and needs an urgent liver transplant that only a family member can give. Pinoko and Sharaku find Niko who agrees instantly but is afraid his adoptive mother may find out that he is not her real son. However, things work out for the better and the two brothers are reunited and both are adopted by Niko's new parents.
| 14 | "The Terrifying Phoenix Disease" (Japanese: 恐怖のフェニックス病) | 208. "Black Jack Disease"; (ブラック・ジャック病) | 31 July 2006 |
Black Jack and Pinoko arrive in a remote village in Africa looking for Dr. Kuma, however they find that many villagers are dead from ailments possibly caused by Phoenix disease. Jack and Pinoko then walk to Arnol Village where they befriend a local girl, Mary, who takes them to Dr. Kuma. Mary's mother falls ill and is rescued by Jack, but he collapses dues to a bite from a tsetse fly. Fortunately Dr. Kuma saves him and reveals that he was an apprentice of Dr. Honma at the time the Noir Project and explains that specialist doctors were gathered by Zen Mantoku to research the secret of eternal life. Dr. Jorujyu discovered a virus which could power artificial organs which they named B.O.P. for Blood of Phoenix. When B.O.P. was used experimentally to power artificial hearts on live subjects, Dr. Honma resigned. Later, Zen Mantoku asked Dr. Kuma to test B.O.P. on animals and although the results were promising at first, the animals and then the villagers began to die. Later, Dr. Kuma is seriously injured by a black panther while trying to save Pinoco and Mary, and the villagers donate blood to save him. Jack then receives an urgent message that his father is in a coma.
| 15 | "The Truth About Black Jack's Father"; Transliteration: "Black Jack Chichioya no Shinjitsu" (Japanese: Black Jack父親の真実) | 233. "Flesh and Blood"; (骨肉) | 14 August 2006 |
Black Jack returns to aid his comatose father and be a part of the family, but it is a ploy by his stepmother Renka's father, Zen Mantoku, to obtain his mother's pendant containing the microfiche. Jack refuses, but the organization's henchmen kidnap Pinoko and lure Black Jack in to a trap. Suddenly, Benitokage appears and saves Pinoko and Jack, but another henchman knocks them both out and takes Jack to meet Zen Mantoku, head of the organization and also Renka's father. Mantoku asks Jack to join his organization, revealing that he planted the bomb years ago which injured Jack and killed his mother, and forced Kagemitsu to work for him. Jack refuses the offer, declaring that he has released the secret about the Noir Project to the world. He also reveals the identity of Benitokage who is the first daughter of Kagemitsu and Renka. Benitokage helps Jack escape but he is shot in the leg. He operates on himself, using parts from his father's body with the help of Dr. Kuwata. Later, when Jack and Pinoko are set to return to Japan at the Airport, he is targeted by a sniper, but Benitokage saves his life by sacrificing her own.
| 16 | "The Challenge Against Extinction"; Transliteration: "Hametsu e no jyousen" (Japanese: 破滅への挑戦) | 138. "The Next Chance" (きたるべきチャンス) &; 196. "Cancer Hunter" (腫瘍狩り) | 29 August 2006 |
Black Jack prepared to return to Japan with Pinoko when he is requested to go to the Sky Hospital. Jack finds the only patient is Zen Mantoku, who suffers from the Phoenix disease because he and the other members of the Noir Project were injected with B.O.P. Jack agrees to assist Dr. White for 1¥ billion to develop a cure. However, Renka, aggrieved by the loss of her husband and daughter, and fact that Black Jack gave her the face of her husband's former wife, secretly plots to kill Jack and obtain the vaccine so she can make a fortune from spreading the Phoenix disease. One of Renka's henchmen tries to hijack the Sky Hospital, causing Mantoku to exit his "cancer hunter" containment capsule and spreading a mutated version of the Phoenix Disease within the aircraft.
| 17 | "The Sanctity of Life"; Transliteration: "Inochi no Songen" (Japanese: 生命の尊厳) | 146. "99% Water" (99.9%の水) &; 195. "The Second One" (二人目がいた) | 4 September 2006 |
Black Jack tells Dr. White to change the course of the Sky Hospital to the North Pole while they are told that the Doctors from around the world are working to cure to the Phoenix disease. Dr. Kuma reveals that they only have 21 hours to find a cure or die before a Nuclear Missile will be fired to destroy the Virus and all those infected. Renka boards the Sky Hospital planning to kill Jack, but her father, Zen Mantoku, tries to stop her and they shoot each other. Zen Mantoku dies but Renka survives and Jack operates to save her. Jack discovers an anti-virus in her system and which will cure to the Phoenix disease, but the missile has been launched. As the Phoenix disease continues to spread in Black Jack's body, he passes out and sees Benitokage, Dr. Kiriko, Dr. Honma, and his parents, all telling him that he's done enough. He also sees Pinoko in an adult 18-year-old form who tells him that the patients are still waiting and that she will never leave his side. Dr. White successfully evades the missile detonation, flying everyone to safety. The cure is named Honma Antiserum in honor of Dr. Honma and is made free to anyone in need. Finally Jack and Pinoko return the site of his ruined house and he decides to rebuild.
