= Astro Boy: The Video Game =

2009 video game

- North American cover art for PlayStation 2
- Developers: High Voltage Software; Art Co., Ltd (DS)
- Publisher: D3 Publisher
- Engine: Quantum3
- Platforms: Wii, PlayStation 2, PlayStation Portable, Nintendo DS
- Release: October 8, 2009: PlayStation Portable; JP: October 8, 2009; NA: October 14, 2009 (downloadable); NA: October 20, 2009 (Retail); EU: October 22, 2009 (downloadable); AU: October 23, 2009; EU: February 5, 2010 (retail) PlayStation 2; NA: October 20, 2009; AU: October 22, 2009; EU: February 5, 2010 Wii; NA: October 20, 2009; AU: October 29, 2009; EU: February 5, 2010 Nintendo DS; NA: October 20, 2009; AU: November 13, 2009; EU: February 5, 2010
- Genre: Platform
- Modes: Single-player, multiplayer

Astro Boy: The Video Game is a 2009 platform game based on the computer animated film Astro Boy. The game was released in Japan on October 8, 2009, for the PlayStation Portable under the name Atom (アトム, Atomu) to coincide with the Japanese theatrical release on October 10, 2009. It was later released on the same system as a downloadable game in North America on October 14, 2009. It received a retail version of it and a port to the PlayStation 2, Wii and Nintendo DS which were released on October 20, 2009, to coincide with the theatrical release of the film on October 23, 2009. It features the voices of Freddie Highmore and Kristen Bell, who both reprise their film roles.

== Gameplay ==
The game allows the player to be Astro Boy, utilising his array of weapons while fighting robot armies. The game features levels set on the ground, in which Astro fights while advancing by walking, and also in the air, which mainly includes Astro shooting airborne enemies down using his finger laser, reminiscent of Omega Factor's gameplay in a 2D platformer format. Collectables include different costumes and also power-ups found in difficult-to-reach or hidden areas. While attacking, alongside his normal attacks, a player may wish to activate a 'Special Attack', provided they have enough energy to do so. A meter limits the amount of Special Attacks a player can use, being Arm Cannons, Machine Guns and Absorb (which allows the player to recharge a certain portion of their health).

It features both a single-player mode as well as a multiplayer mode, with the second player being another Astro in an alternate costume. During Story Mode, if a player loses a life while the other is still playing, they can rejoin the game with full health after a certain amount of time. However, if both players lose lives at the same time, the game is lost. A separate mode allows both players to fight in the robot games ring, and the player with the most points at the end wins.

The game offers numerous unlockable and collectable elements that include exclusive artwork and different versions of Astro Boy.

== Reception ==
Reception

Aggregate score
Aggregator	Score			
Aggregator	DS	PS2	PSP	Wii
Metacritic	34/100	56/100	60/100	48/100

Review scores
Publication	Score			
Publication	DS	PS2	PSP	Wii
Edge	3/10	N/A	N/A	N/A
Famitsu	N/A	N/A	21/40	N/A
GamePro	N/A	N/A	N/A	3/5
GameSpot	N/A	N/A	N/A	4.5/10
GamesRadar+	N/A	3/5	3/5	3/5
GameZone	5.8/10	N/A	6/10	6.3/10
IGN	4/10	N/A	N/A	5.7/10
Nintendo Power	N/A	N/A	N/A	7.5/10
Nintendo World Report	3/10	N/A	N/A	3.5/10
PlayStation: The Official Magazine	N/A	N/A	2.5/5	N/A
Teletext GameCentral	N/A	N/A	N/A	3/10

The PlayStation 2 and PSP versions received "mixed" reviews, while the DS and Wii versions received "generally unfavorable reviews", according to the review aggregation website Metacritic. In Japan, Famitsu gave the PSP version a score of two sixes, one five, and one four for a total of 21 out of 40.

Giancarlo Varanini of GameSpot said the Wii version featured "sloppy hand-to-hand combat," "repetitive level design," "muddled and unimpressive graphics," and that the game is "too short." While he did find many problems with the game, he did say it was "slightly more fun with a buddy." He also criticized the game for not "capitalizing on Astro Boy's skills."

Jack DeVries of IGN called the Wii version "a mediocre brawler with some pretty good shooter levels." DeVries also said that "The in-game cutscenes are hilariously bad." He summarizes the game by saying, "It all comes off as bland."

Jon Carlos of Game Vortex gave the same version a fairly good review, saying, "I give Astro Boy: The Video Game kudos for at least heading in the right direction when it comes to gameplay design." However, he noted that, "Unfortunately, Astro Boy: The Video Game isn't much more than another film cash-in. Nearly everything in this game is stale, uninteresting and forgettable."
