= Mighty Atom (TV series) =

- Based on: Astro Boy
- Written by: Shigetoshi Iwata; Haruo Koorogi; Isoya Shibuya; Ichirō Miyagawa; Noboru Sakamaki; Hiroyuki Shinami
- Directed by: Hiroshi Yoshikawa; Seika Shiba; Hideo Ōhashi; Toshio Naniwa
- Starring: (see list): Masato Segawa Kazumasa Negishi Mitsuo Nakagawa Gorō Morino Hiroko Negishi Hiroshi Miki Rashōmon Tsunagorō Yonehiko Kitagawa Akio Tanaka Kazuya Tominaga Kinichi Shimizu Harue Wakahara Hiroshi Kiyama Chizō Kurata Ryūsuke Nakae Kiyoshi Itō Kiyoshi Kobayashi Masao Takahashi Takako Irie Nobuo Maki Nikki Kubota Kōtarō Mori
- Opening theme: Mighty Atom Theme
- Ending theme: Mighty Atom Theme
- Composers: Hirooki Ogawa; Katsuyuki Masuda
- Country of origin: Japan
- No. of seasons: 1
- No. of episodes: 65

Production
- Producers: Keiji Matsuzaki; Tsuyoshi Yoneyama
- Cinematography: Yutaka Yoshida; Hiroshi Segawa
- Camera setup: Single-camera
- Running time: 25 minutes
- Production company: Matsuzaki Production

Original release
- Network: MBS
- Release: March 7, 1959 – May 28, 1960

Related
- Mighty Atom (1963 anime)

Mighty Atom (鉄腕アトム, Tetsuwan Atomu) is a Japanese black-and-white tokusatsu live-action TV drama that aired on MBS from March 7, 1959, to May 28, 1960, for a total of 65 episodes split into five parts.

== Production ==
Tetsuwan Atomu was produced for Mainichi Broadcasting System, sponsored by Lotte Corporation, by Matsuzaki Production, founded by Keiji Matsuzaki, who worked with Eiji Tsuburaya as a special effects director before the war and was a Toho producer.

It is the first adaptation of Osamu Tezuka's Mighty Atom (a.k.a. Astro Boy) manga comic book series and predates the 1963 Mighty Atom (Astro Boy) anime.

== Plot ==
The series condenses the original's science fiction elements, more in line with the detective stories of the time, with a focus on fighting gangsters. In the original, the story takes place in the 21st century, but according to Atom's dialogue in the second part finale, the series takes place in 1959, the same year as the broadcast.

== Reception ==
Although the series was popular for a year, Tezuka became dissatisfied with the adaptation, saying that it was too far removed from the image of the original work, and this became the driving force behind the production of the first Astro Boy anime a few years later. In addition, when Sōji Ushio approached Tezuka in 1965 to make a live-action Ambassador Magma, Tezuka initially suggested that he make a live-action Big X for this reason.

However, P Productions' live-action Magma received high praise from Tezuka, and the bad impression of live-action adaptations was dispelled, and Tezuka himself considered producing a live-action version of Mighty Atom in 1972.
