= Astro Boy (film) =

2009 film by David Bowers

- Theatrical release poster
- Directed by: David Bowers
- Written by: Timothy Hyde Harris; David Bowers
- Story by: David Bowers
- Based on: Astro Boy by Osamu Tezuka
- Produced by: Maryann Garger; Kuzuka Yayoki
- Starring: Freddie Highmore; Kristen Bell; Nicolas Cage; Donald Sutherland; Bill Nighy; Matt Lucas; Eugene Levy; Samuel L. Jackson; Charlize Theron; Nathan Lane
- Cinematography: Pepe Valencia
- Edited by: Robert Anich
- Music by: John Ottman
- Production company: Imagi Studios
- Distributed by: Summit Entertainment (United States); Panasia Films (Hong Kong)
- Release dates: October 8, 2009 (Hong Kong); October 23, 2009 (United States)
- Running time: 94 minutes
- Countries: Hong Kong; United States
- Language: English
- Budget: $65 million
- Box office: $42 million

Astro Boy is a 2009 animated superhero science-fiction adventure comedy film loosely based on the manga series by Osamu Tezuka. Produced by the Hong Kong-based company Imagi Studios, it was directed by David Bowers who co-wrote the screenplay with Timothy Hyde Harris. The film stars Freddie Highmore, Kristen Bell, Nicolas Cage, Donald Sutherland, Bill Nighy, Matt Lucas, Eugene Levy, Samuel L. Jackson, Charlize Theron, and Nathan Lane.

Set in the 22nd century in Metro City—a floating futuristic city-state where robots serve humankind—Dr. Tenma (Cage) creates Astro (Highmore), a teenage robot implanted with the likeness and memories of his son after the latter is killed in an accident. After Tenma disowns his creation, Astro inadvertently ends up on Earth's dirty surface, where he finds companionship with the residents. Meanwhile, Stone (Sutherland), the president of Metro City who is running for re-election, seeks Astro's unique power source to fuel his defense robot.

Astro Boy was first released in Hong Kong on October 8, 2009, and in the United States on October 23. It received generally mixed reviews from film critics and was a financial failure, earning $42 million worldwide against its $65 million budget. As a result of the film's bad performance, Imagi Studios was shut down on February 5, 2010.

== Plot ==
In the 22nd century, Toby Tenma is a teenager who lives in the futuristic city-state of Metro City, which floats above the polluted Earth. His father, Dr. Tenma, works at the Ministry of Science, alongside Dr. Elefun. Under orders of President Stone, who is running for re-election, they have created the Peacekeeper, an advanced defensive robot fueled by two powerful energy spheres with opposite properties, respectively in the colors blue and red, from a star fragment discovered by Elefun. Against the scientists' warnings, Stone loads the negative red core into the Peacekeeper, causing it to become hostile and indirectly kill Toby while attempting to violently leave the research facility before Elefun disables it.

Heartbroken, Tenma makes a robot programmed with Toby's memories, along with built-in defenses, including flight and the ability to understand silent robots. Powered by the positive blue core, the robot activates and believes himself to be Toby. Though the robot has Toby's memories and a similar personality, Tenma realizes nothing could replace the original Toby and rejects him. Stone has his forces pursue Toby in an effort to retrieve the blue core, leading to him falling off Metro City's edge when Stone's flagship blasts him. Afterwards, Tenma escapes arrest by agreeing to disable Toby and give up the blue core.

Toby awakens in an enormous junkyard populated by robots dumped from Metro City. He meets a group of orphaned children—Zane, Sludge, Widget, and Cora—accompanied by a dog-like robot named Trashcan, and the Robot Revolutionary Front (RRF) members Sparx, Robotsky, and Mike the Fridge, who plan to free robots from mankind's control, but are very inept and bound by the Laws of Robotics. While attempting to recruit him for their cause, they rename Toby "Astro". Hamegg, the former head of the Ministry of Science and caretaker of the orphans, takes Astro in. The next day, Astro comes across an old, offline construction robot named Zog, whom he reactivates through sharing some of the blue core's energy. After restoring Zog, Astro has a heart-to-heart with Cora, discovering that Cora is from Metro City, having run away from home, but is regretful of her decision out of love for her parents. Later, Hamegg, having secretly discovered Astro is a robot, knocks him out with an electric blaster to use him in his robot arena, the Robot Games, before publicly acknowledging Astro's true self.

Astro defeats Hamegg's fighters until Zog gets deployed. The two robots refuse to fight due to their friendship and Hamegg tortures Astro. Zog, who predates the Laws of Robotics, almost kills Hamegg before Astro saves him. Moments later, Stone's forces arrive to take Astro back to Metro City, and he willingly surrenders himself. Astro reunites with Tenma and Elefun, and the former disables him. Realizing that he loves Astro as much as Toby, Tenma steals back the core, and stalls Stone long enough to reactivate and free Astro. Outraged, Stone powers up the Peacekeeper with the red core, commanded to destroy Astro and return with the blue core: the Peacekeeper instead absorbs Stone and many other objects, growing to a gargantuan size. Stone gains control of the fusion and goes on a rampage, prompting Astro to return to Metro City to battle the Peacekeeper. In the ensuing fight, Metro City's power station gets destroyed and causes it to fall. Astro uses his superhuman strength to help Metro City land safely.

The Peacekeeper tries absorbing Astro to get his blue core using the red core, but are separated due to the cores' repulsive reactions. Tenma tells Astro that the cores will violently destroy each other on contact, thus, killing them both. The Peacekeeper captures Astro's friends from the junkyard, who were searching for him, and he shares a farewell with his father before flying into the Peacekeeper's core, sacrificing himself to destroy it. Stone survives and is arrested. As Elefun and the children find a destroyed Astro, Zog revives him with a surge of blue core energy. Reunited with his friends and father, Astro is hailed as a hero, while Cora is finally reunited with her parents. When a monstrous extraterrestrial soon after attacks Metro City, Astro leaps into action.

== Cast ==
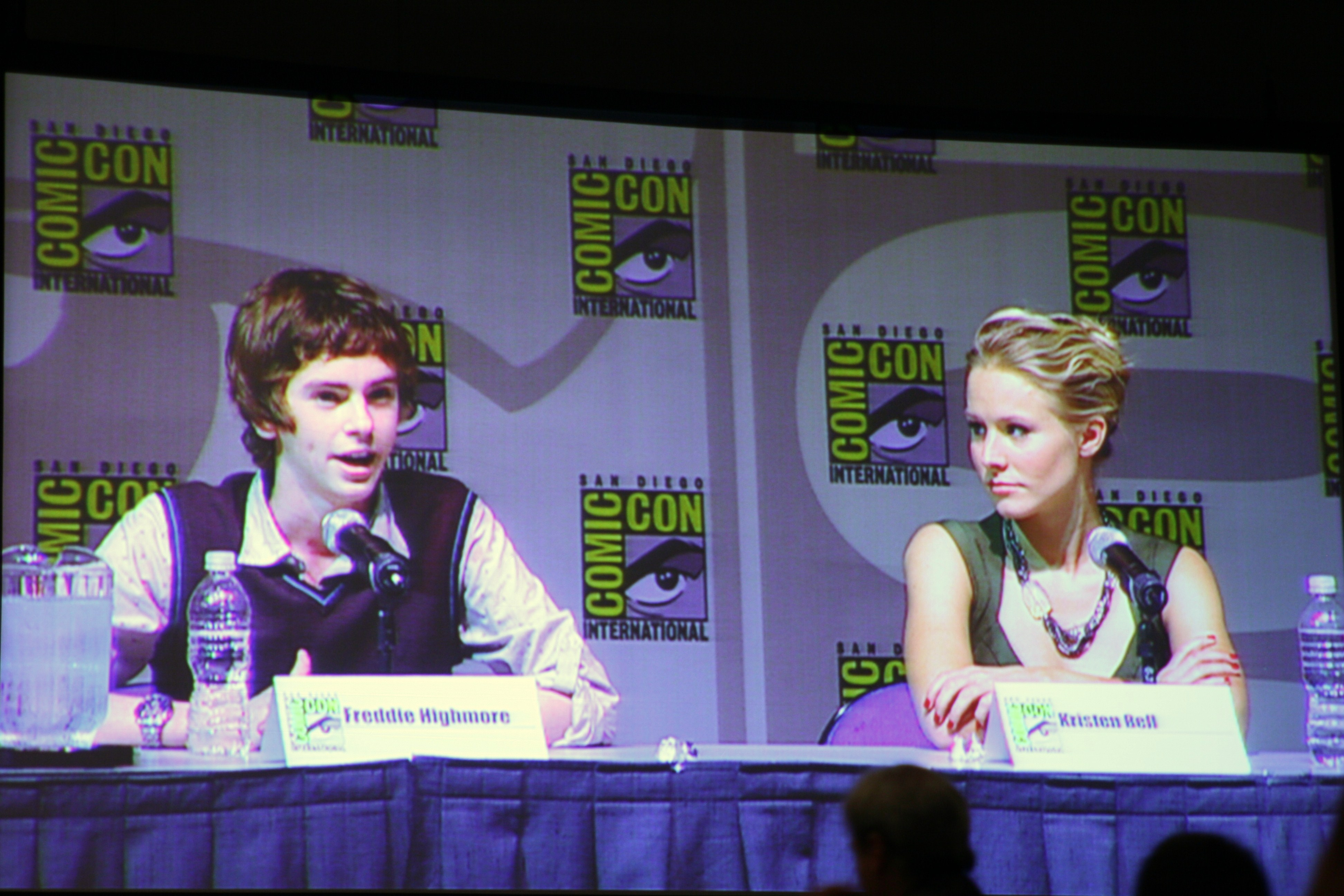
Freddie Highmore and Kristen Bell promoting the film at the 2009 San Diego Comic-Con.

- Freddie Highmore as Toby Tenma/Astro Boy, Astro is a virtuous robot replica of Toby, Dr. Tenma's 13-year-old son.
- Kristen Bell as Cora, a teenage girl who lives on the Earth's surface and befriends Astro.
- Nicolas Cage as Dr. Bill Tenma, Toby's father, Astro's creator, and the head of the Ministry of Science of Metro City.
- Samuel L. Jackson as Zog, a 100-year-old construction robot brought back to life by Astro Boy's blue core energy.
- Matt Lucas as Sparx, the incompetent leader of the Robot Revolutionary Front.
- Eugene Levy as Orrin, Tenma's cowardly robot household servant.
- Bill Nighy as Dr. Elefun, Dr. Tenma's best friend and associate
  - Nighy also voiced Robotsky, the muscle of the Robot Revolutionary Front.
- Donald Sutherland as President Stone, a vicious and ambitious President of Metro City who is running for re-election.
  - Sutherland also voiced The Peacekeeper, a military robot powered by the red core built to wage a war on the surface.
- Nathan Lane as Hamegg, a surface-dweller who repairs machines and then uses them in his arena.
- Charlize Theron as the "Our Friends" narrator, the voice used for an educational video seen at the film's beginning.
- David Bowers as Mike the Fridge, a talking refrigerator and third member of the Robot Revolutionary Front.
- Moisés Arias as Zane, a surface-dwelling child.
- Alan Tudyk as Mr. Squeegee, a cleaning robot that Astro encounters.
- David Alan Grier as Mr. Squirt, a cleaning robot that Astro encounters.
- Madeline Carroll as Widget, Sludge's twin.
- Sterling Beaumon as Sludge, Widget's twin.
- Dee Bradley Baker as Trashcan, a dog-like robot that eats rubbish.
- Elle Fanning as Grace, a girl from Hamegg's house who kicks President Stone's leg.
- Ryan Stiles as Mr. Mustachio, Toby's teacher.
- Newell Alexander as General Heckler, President Stone's second in-command.
- Victor Bonavida as Sam, a teenage boy from Hamegg's house.
- Tony Matthews as Cora's dad.
- Bob Logan as Stinger One, President Stone's former pilot soldier dispatched to arrest Astro.
- Ryan Ochoa as Rick, another teenage boy from Hamegg's house.

== Production ==
=== Development ===
In 1997, Sony Pictures Entertainment purchased the film rights to Astro Boy from Tezuka Productions, intending to produce a live-action feature film. Todd Alcott was set to write the screenplay, but the film halted in 2000 when Steven Spielberg began A.I. Artificial Intelligence (2001), another film with a robot boy who replaces a dead child. In December 2001, Sony hired Eric Leighton to direct an all-CGI film, with Angry Films and Jim Henson Productions producing it for a 2004 release. A screenplay draft was written, but the film did not go into production, and Leighton left in early 2003 to pursue other film projects. In June 2004, animator and Dexter's Laboratory creator Genndy Tartakovsky was hired to direct a live-action/animatronics/CGI feature film. A script was written, but the film did not go into production, and Tartakovsky left the next year to direct 3-D-animated feature films at a new studio, Orphanage Animation Studios. A few months later it was revealed that he was set to direct The Dark Crystal (1982) sequel, The Power of the Dark Crystal, another co-production with Jim Henson Productions. In September 2006, it was announced that Hong Kong-based animation firm Imagi Animation Studios would produce a CGI animated Astro Boy film, with Colin Brady directing. A year later, the studio made a three-picture distribution deal with Warner Bros. and The Weinstein Company, which also included TMNT (2007) and Gatchaman. In 2008, Summit Entertainment, Which is before Lionsgate Films acquired, Took over the distribution rights. The same year, Brady was replaced with David Bowers, who previously directed Flushed Away (2006), the last project under the relationship between DreamWorks Animation, the creators of the Shrek and Madagascar franchises, and Aardman Animations, the creators of the Wallace & Gromit franchise and Chicken Run.

=== Design ===
Image of Astro Boy and Zog in early CGI footage

Like TMNT, the film was CGI animated on Maya and rendered on Pixar's RenderMan at Imagi's Los Angeles facility and its main studio in Hong Kong. Some changes to Astro's design had to be made in order to appeal to a western audience and making the leap to CGI. The more challenging was his kawaii portrayal, part of which were his large eyes and curly eyelashes, features that the filmmakers thought made him too feminine. Imagi had several discussions on how round and curvy Astro's body proportions should be and in the end they were made slimmer. The by-product of these changes was Astro's Caucasian look. In early development Astro's design was young, resembling his iconic design of a 9-year-old boy. The design team changed that and made him look like a 13-year-old to appeal to a larger audience. They also gave him a white shirt and a blue jacket, replacing the character's traditional shirtless appearance, since they thought it would be strange to have a normal boy running around without a shirt. They also replaced his heart-shaped energy core with a glowing blue one.

=== Music ===
The score to Astro Boy was composed by John Ottman, who recorded his score with a 95-piece orchestra and choir at Abbey Road Studios. A soundtrack album was released on October 20, 2009, by Varèse Sarabande Records. Songs in Astro Boy not composed by John Ottman are as follows: Breezy Day, composed by Roger-Roger. Alright, written by Daniel Goffey, Gaz Coombes, and Michael Quinn and performed by Supergrass. Marching Down the Field, composed by Harry Edwards.

== Marketing ==
Summit collaborated with McDonald's to produce marketing tie-ins for Astro Boy. Beginning in May 2009 and continuing through September 2009, IDW Publishing published a "prequel" and comic book adaptation of the film as both mini-series and in graphic novel format to coincide with the North American release of the film in October 2009. A model of a motionless Astro Boy waiting to be powered up was set up at Peak Tower, Hong Kong, outside Madame Tussauds Hong Kong in September 2009. A panel of the film was held at San Diego Comic-Con on July 23, 2009.

Before the film's release, Francis Kao stepped down as Imagi's chairman and CEO due in part to his disapproval of the marketing budget allotted for the film, adding that "I knew the movie would be bad and decided to leave the moment I saw the poster. It was just Astro Boy flying in the sky. It didn't tell a story; it had no feeling."

== Release ==
=== Box office ===
The film was a box office bomb in the U.S., opening at No. 6, grossing $6.7 million, losing out to Zombieland (2009). It remained in the Top 10 for three weeks. When it closed in January 2010, it had a total gross of $20 million. Overall, the film had a worldwide gross of $44.6 million against a $65 million budget. The film was also a flop in Japan, appearing at the bottom of the opening week's Top 10 rankings and earning only $328,457. Conversely, the film was very successful in China, breaking a box-office record for a CGI-animated film. This follows the same pattern as Dragonball Evolution (2009) and Speed Racer (2008), other American-produced films based on Japanese sources that were not big hits in the land of their origin but were very successful in China.

=== Critical response ===
On the review aggregator website Rotten Tomatoes, the film has an approval rating of 51% based on 137 reviews, with an average score of 5.6/10. The website's critical consensus reads, "While it isn't terribly original, and it seems to have a political agenda that may rankle some viewers, Astro Boy boasts enough visual thrills to please its target demographic." On Metacritic, the film has a weighted average score of 53 out of 100 based on 22 critics, indicating "mixed or average" reviews.

Owen Gleiberman of Entertainment Weekly gave the film a B and wrote that it had a "little too much lost-boys-and-girls mopiness", but "Astro Boy is a marvelously designed piece of cartoon kinetics..." Glenn Whipp of the Los Angeles Times gave the mixed review claiming "The kids won't get it but will enjoy the big, climactic robot rumpuses, which owe a heavy debt to Brad Bird's The Iron Giant (1999)". Manohla Dargis of The New York Times gave it a mixed review, criticizing the film's confused tonal mixture of darkness and "commercially motivated" optimism.

Conversely, Roger Ebert gave the film three out of four stars, stating that "The movie contains less of its interesting story and more action and battle scenes than I would have preferred. [...] Still, 'Astro Boy' is better than most of its recent competitors, such as 'Monsters vs. Aliens' and 'Kung Fu Panda.'" Richard Corliss, writing for Time, also gave the movie a positive review, writing that "Any purely reasoned critique of Astro Boy would note that it does not advance the art of animation, and that some of its humor stabs miss their mark. But Bowers knows how to infuse emotion without just ladling it out in Act III; it is at the core of the story, as Astro Toby teaches his father the verities of love, heroism and family feeling."

=== Home media ===
Astro Boy was released on DVD and Blu-ray in the United States on March 16, 2010, by Universal Pictures Home Entertainment. Both releases include two new CGI shorts, a featurette with the voice cast, three other featurettes about drawing Astro Boy, making a CGI movie, and getting the Astro Boy look, and an image gallery.

In Japan, a limited edition Astro Boy premium box set was released on April 2, 2010, by Kadokawa. It featured the same content from the American release, with the exception of it spanning two DVDs (one containing the film, the other containing special features, with two that are exclusive to Japan) and having both English and Japanese dubs (along with English and Japanese subtitles). The box set also comes with a DVD (containing a single story on Astro's first flight and an image gallery), Dr. Tenma's Project Notes (featuring 80 pages of CGI models, character art and set designs from the film), a Micro SD (featuring the motion manga Atomu Tanjo (Birth of Astro Boy) originally written by Osamu Tezuka), a postcard of 1980 Astro Boy flying, a small bookmark (a reel from the film inside a plastic cover), and Astro's blueprints from the film.

Astro Boy was bundled with Furry Vengeance on Blu-ray in the United States on May 6, 2014 by Lionsgate Home Entertainment, Which is after Lionsgate Films acquired Summit Entertainment.

=== Accolades ===
At the 37th Annie Awards, Astro Boy received nominations for Outstanding Achievement for Storyboarding in a Feature Production (Sharon Bridgeman) and Outstanding Achievement for Writing in a Feature Production (Harris and Bowers). Linda Lamontagne was nominated for Outstanding Achievement in Casting – Animation Feature at the 2010 Artios Awards.

== Video game ==
A video game based on the film was released on October 20, 2009, by D3 Publisher to coincide with the film's theatrical release. The Wii, PlayStation 2 and PSP versions were developed by High Voltage Software, and the Nintendo DS version by Art Co., Ltd. Like the film, the game received mixed reviews.
