= Don Dracula =

Japanese manga series

- Cover of Don Dracula volume 1 from the Osamu Tezuka Manga Complete Works edition.

ドン・ドラキュラ (Don Dorakyura)
- Genre: Comedy horror
- Manga
- Written by: Osamu Tezuka
- Published by: Akita Shoten
- Magazine: Weekly Shōnen Champion
- Original run: May 28, 1979 – December 10, 1979
- Volumes: 3
- Anime television series
- Directed by: Masamune Ochiai
- Written by: Takao Koyama
- Music by: Masayuki Yamamoto; Masaaki Jinbo
- Studio: Jin Productions
- Original network: MegaTon (TV Tokyo)
- Original run: April 5, 1982 – April 26, 1982
- Episodes: 8

Don Dracula (ドン・ドラキュラ, Don Dorakyura) is a manga by Osamu Tezuka that began serialization in 1979. An anime television series aired from April 5 to April 26, 1982.

== Plot ==
After living in Transylvania for several years, Count Dracula has moved to Japan (the English summary on the front page of volume 1 of the "Complete Works Edition" says that a mercantile firm bought Castle Dracula and moved it to Tokyo without knowing it was inhabited). In the Nerima Ward of Tokyo, he and his daughter, Chocola, and faithful servant Igor continue to live in the castle.

While Chocola attends night classes at Matsutani Junior High School, Dracula is desperate to drink the blood of beautiful virgin women; an appropriate meal for a vampire of his stature. However, each night that Dracula goes out on the prowl he finds himself getting involved in some kind of disturbance which leads to him causing various trouble for the local residents. With nobody in Japan believing in vampires, his very presence causes trouble amongst the people in town.

The slapstick comedy of the proud vampire adjusting to life in Japan is compounded by Professor Hellsing, Earl Dracula's nemesis for the past ten years. He has come to Japan to exterminate Dracula, but has the tragic flaw of suffering from hemorrhoids. In addition, Dracula is also pursued by Blonda, the first woman Dracula was able to drink blood from when he arrived in Japan. Because Blonda has a face only a mother could love, Dracula wants to get as far away from her as possible.

Published in the same magazine as Black Jack at the same time, Tezuka commented that creating the slapstick antics of the poor vampire was very enjoyable.

== Characters ==
Count Dracula
The legendary vampire who finds himself having a harder time living in Japan than he did in Transylvania. He spends his days sleeping in his coffin in the basement of his castle, and his nights prowling the streets of Shinjuku and Shibuya. He's weakened by water (in almost any form) and anything in the shape of a cross. He can be destroyed with a stake through his chest. Sunlight will turn him into dust, but Igor or Chocola will usually vacuum him up and then reconstitute him ala instant ramen with a magic spell that includes a cup of blood plus the contents of the vacuum cleaner.
Chocola
Dracula's daughter who is currently attending night classes at Matsutachi Junior High School in Tokyo. Because she is half-vampire and half-werewolf, Chocola can survive in water just fine, but she will still turn to dust when exposed to sunlight. She can eat normal human food, but prefers human blood. Unlike her father, she is willing to bite men as well as women, but she has accepted that her classmates are off-limits. She is a member of the school's SF club.
Nobuhiko Ōbayashi
Chocola's classmate at Matsutani Junior High, and a member of the school's SF club. He believes in aliens and UFOs, but not old-school creatures like vampires or werewolves. In volume two, he's forced to change to a day school because of his father's job, but he does still occasionally visit Matsutachi.
Rip van Helsing
Hailing from the Netherlands, he is Dracula's enemy for the past 10 years, fiercely determined to eradicate all vampires on Earth, but he suffers from a severe case of hemorrhoids. He follows Dracula to Tokyo where he gets a job as a teacher in Matsutani Junior High. However, after he tries to make some extra money selling Dracula's "cunning pencils" (hollowed pencils with a lens at one end and the test answers on a rolled up sheet stuck inside) he gets caught and fired. He never actually catches a vampire during the series. He uses the same character design as Astro Boy's Dr. Fooler.
Carmilla
A female werewolf that Dracula was once married to. They divorced shortly after Chocola was born because Camilla wanted to raise Chocola as a human killer. Dracula draws the line at killing humans outright. She only appears in one chapter.
Igor
Dracula and Chocola's servant who is actually quite kind-hearted despite his fierce appearance. Spends most of his time either driving the family horse-drawn carriage, or vacuuming up someone's ashes. His primary weakness is being exposed to naked women.
Blonda Gray
An ugly woman who was the first person Dracula sucked blood from in Japan. Suffers from extremely high blood pressure and was originally married to Dorian Gray back when both of them lived in Prague. As a student, Dorian made a pact with the devil to become successful, which led to his marrying the (at the time) beautiful Blonda, but eventually he became violent and after three years was pulled into a picture frame. Blonda left him at about this point, and moved to Japan where she became a hostess at a bar and began over-indulging herself on ramen.
Police Inspector Murai
An inept gun-toting detective who looks like a cross between Lupin's Inspector Zenigata and Gegege no Ge Kitaro's Nezumi Otoko. Tends to shoot his pistol randomly in the air when excited.

== Other appearances ==
- An anime television series of Don Dracula was commissioned in 1982 by Tezuka Productions, directed by Masamune Ochiai, with the voices of Kenji Utsumi as Don Dracula and Saeko Shimazu (best known as Urusei Yatsura's Shinobu Miyake) as Chocola. The series debuted in April 1982, but only eight episodes were produced, and only four of those eight episodes made it to air, due to the bankruptcy of the anime's sponsoring company. The four "lost" episodes were later seen when the anime was dubbed for airing in other territories, but remained unavailable in Japan until the series was released on DVD.
- Don Dracula appears like a servant of Sharaku in Marine Express, and his daughter Chocola also appears in the role of Milly, the cyborg daughter of Duke Red.
- Don Dracula appears as a hospital director in the manga episode "Like B.J." of Black Jack.
- Don Dracula appears in the 2004 Game Boy Advance game, Astro Boy: Omega Factor, in the same role he had in Marine Express.
- A more human-looking version of Don Dracula is used as a principal in the Black Jack anime television series, episode 57: "Pinoko's Exam Diary".

== See also ==
- Osamu Tezuka
- List of Osamu Tezuka manga
- List of Osamu Tezuka anime
- Osamu Tezuka's Star System
