= Undersea Super Train: Marine Express =

1979 television film

- The cover for the Japanese VHS release of Undersea Super Train: Marine Express from VAP video.

海底超特急 マリン・エクスプレス (Kaitei Chōtokkyū Marine Express)
- Genre: Drama, science fiction, fantasy
- Anime television film
- Directed by: Satoshi Dezaki
- Produced by: Hidehiko Takei; Satoru Yamamoto
- Written by: Osamu Tezuka
- Music by: Yuji Ohno
- Studio: Tezuka Productions
- Original network: Nippon Television Network
- Released: August 26, 1979
- Runtime: 91 minutes

Undersea Super Train: Marine Express (海底超特急 マリン・エクスプレス, Kaitei Chōtokkyū Marin Ekusupuresu) is an anime television film created for the Nippon Television Network's annual 24-hour charity program, Ai wa Chikyū o Suku, which roughly translates to "Love Saves the Earth". The film contained a veritable "Who's Who" of manga creator Osamu Tezuka's notable characters. Each one had an important role, and many of them had individual, intertwining stories which would overlap with the ones of others. To coincide with the central theme of the charity program, the film emphasized on the dangers of environmental destruction, and that such disasters can be overcome by banding together.

For the previous charity special in 1978, Osamu Tezuka and Tezuka Productions created One Million-Year Trip: Bander Book. The year after, when the special was held again in 1980, Tezuka and Tezuka Productions created another film, Fumoon, based on Tezuka's manga Nextworld.

== Plot ==
The plot of Marine Express can be described in two parts. The first and longer part focuses on the people boarding the train and the problems they encounter on it. The second part takes place after the train has stopped at its half-way point, an island that used to be home to an ancient civilization millennia ago and has its fair share of secrets.

=== Trouble on the Train ===
The story takes place in the year 2002.

Construction of the Marine Express is complete. The train can take passengers from Los Angeles, California to Japan through glass tunnels. To celebrate the completion, a test run is arranged with many of the train's founders and their families on board. Doctor Narzenkopf is the designer of the train; his oldest and adopted son, Rock, is the train's pilot along with Doctor Narzonkopf is his youngest son, Adam.

In addition to the train's staff, others have boarded the train without permission. One of them is Shunsaku Ban, a detective on the trail of a criminal who he suspects is on board the train. Originally, he had been hired by the Chief Engineer of the Marine Express to investigate a possibility that someone was going to try and use the train for illicit means. Upon arriving at the engineer's home, Shunsaku was shocked to find his client murdered. Furthermore, the murderer hadn't left the premises yet, and when Shunsaku caught a glimpse of the culprit's face, he was shot. After recovering and seeing TV coverage of the train's test-run, Shunsaku now has reason to believe the man he's after is on the train.

In addition to Shunsaku, others who had boarded the train without position include Black Jack, a surgeon who treated Shunsaku Ban and has followed him onto the train in order to receive payment for his medical bill, and also Skunk Kusai, a criminal who intends to use the train as a means to smuggle illegal weapons and is the one responsible for murdering Shunsaku's client and shooting Shunsaku.

On the train, many disastrous situations arise forcing the passengers to work together to overcome their obstacles.

When Shunsaku Ban confronts Skunk, he and his cohorts fight back, forcing Shunsaku and a few other passengers to band together to keep the criminals from taking over the train. In the firefight, Doctor Narzenkopf is critically wounded, forcing Black Jack to do immediate brain surgery. However, Doctor Narzenkopf's son, Adam, is actually a robot designed to override the train's systems and explode the train when it reaches the Mariana Trench. The Doctor created Adam to do this because he feared what the Marine Express would do to the ocean ecology and couldn't stand to see its results.

Adam, however, has begun questioning his own existence, knowing that he is a robot, and designed for the sole reason of destroying the train. While in this mental quandary, he befriends the only other child on the train, Milly, daughter of the train's financial backer: Director Credit. Despite their budding friendship, Adam goes to the train's cockpit and takes over the computer systems, integrating them with his own. Overriding the system, Adam intends to force the train to crash, forcing the train to be shut down and preserving the ocean's ecosystems.

In a twist of fate, Adam finds that he is not the only robot on board, Milly is actually a robot as well. Through her kind words and persuasion, she convinces Adam to relinquish control of the train, allowing it and its passengers to reach their destination safely, an island designated as a half-way point and rest stop for the passengers of the train.

=== The Ancient Civilization of Mu ===
Arriving at the island, the surviving passengers disembark to get some rest. Shortly after getting off the train, however, does Rock see a glimpse of a beautiful woman before him. Suddenly, the Marine Express and all of its passengers are transported 30,000 years in the past.

Confused as to where they are, they are approached by a vampire named Dondora. Taking them to his master, they are greeted by the wicked fiend that had displaced the Marine Express and its passengers: Sharaku. A fiendish sorcerer and master of technology, Sharaku intends to use the Marine Express and all technology on it for his own sinister purposes. As for the passengers, he intends them to become excellent slaves.

Before he can execute his fiendish scheme, the passengers are saved by a mysterious white lion that can somehow fly. Escaping from Sharaku, they follow the lion to where a beautiful woman is being held captive. Rock immediately recognizes her as the woman from his vision, and she explains the situation to the Marine Express passengers.

Before Sharaku, she was Empress Sapphire of the Mu Empire. The Mu Empire was a peaceful civilization until Sharaku appeared. He overthrew her, and seized control of the Empire for himself. Not satisfied with just the Mu Empire, Sharaku hopes to expand his reign of power to beyond the Mu civilization. With the Marine Express, he hopes to have total domination of time and space.

Rock swears to Sapphire that he will help her reclaim her kingdom and together with the other passengers, they devise a way to stop the sinister Sharaku. Once defeated, the passengers had to decide what to do next. They could either stay behind to try to help rebuild the Mu Empire or take the Marine Express back to the present. Some that stayed behind included Rock who was going to wed Sapphire and Black Jack who wanted to stay for a while and treat the injured. Only Shunsaku Ban returned to the present, people on an island say what happened was a dream and everyone died on the Marine Express, but a carving on a nearby rock proved the experience to be real.

== Cast ==
Shunsaku Ban as himself: A detective who is hired by the chief engineer of the Marine Express, only to arrive at his client's house to find him murdered. However, Shunsaku witnesses the face of the murderer as he tries to escape the premises, but is then shot as the criminal makes his escape.

In the hospital, his bullet wound is treated and Shunsaku is all set to leave when he sees a television program announcing the test-run of the new Pan-Pacific Undersea Super Train, the Marine Express. There, he sees the same criminal that shot him and murdered his client boarding the train. Dashing out of the hospital, Shunsaku races to the train and boards it, with the doctor that had just treated him in tow since he hadn't paid his medical bill yet.

Voiced by Kōsei Tomita

Black Jack as himself: A doctor who receives Shunsaku Ban as a patient suffering from a gunshot wound. Treating the wound, the doctor is ready to dismiss his patient after he pays his bill, but after Shunsaku sees the man that shot him boarding the Marine Express on TV, he races out of the hospital without paying. Chasing him down, Black Jack arrives at the Marine Express and boards the train so he can receive his payment. However, the doctor's skills are used more than he had imagined when mysterious events revolving around the train and its passengers begin to occur.

Voiced by Nachi Nozawa

Pinoco as herself: Voiced by Miina Tominaga
Skunk Kusai as himself: A criminal who murders Shunsaku Ban's client, shoots Shunsaku Ban, and then escapes to the Marine Express to make his escape, but his plans for the Marine Express are more complex than it would seem. Using the dummy passengers on the train used to simulate real passengers when the train has finished its test run, Skunk has hidden weapons inside each one of them to attempt to smuggle them out of the country, but the things do not go exactly as planned.

Voiced by Kōji Yada

Acetylene Lamp as himself: A conductor on the Marine Express who is helping Skunk with his plans to smuggle weapons on board the train.

Voiced by Kenji Utsumi

Ham Egg as himself:
Boon Marukubi as himself: Voiced by Masashi Amenomori
Kojiro Sasaki as himself: A passenger on the Marine Express who always carries a wooden sword with him. He helps in the battle against Skunk when the criminal's plans are revealed.

Voiced by Shinji Toyota

Duke Red as "Director Credit": The financial backer for the Marine Express who has come on board the train to experience its trail run. With him is his daughter, Milly.

Voiced by Chikao Ōtsuka

Chocola as "Milly": Director Credit's daughter who is on board the train with him. She is very fond of Adam, the only other child on the train, and tries to see him whenever she can, despite her father's wishes that she and Adam stay away from one another. Just like Adam, she has a few secrets of her own.

Voiced by Mami Koyama

Professor Ochanomizu as "Dr. Narzenkopf": An exceptional mechanical engineer, Dr. Narzenkopf has boarded the Marine Express for its test run with his two oldest sons. His oldest son, Rock, is the pilot for the Marine Express. His younger son, Adam, is more of a mystery. Apparently, Dr. Narzenkopf has a bit of an agenda up his sleeve that only he knows about.

Voiced by Hisashi Katsuta

Rock as himself: A young man who is Doctor Narzenkopf's oldest son. He is responsible for piloting the train to its destination, and takes great care in ensuring the safety of the train's passengers. After arriving at the half-way point, he sees a glimpse of a mysterious girl before his eyes. Suddenly, Rock, the Marine Express, and its passengers are whisked away to 30,000 years in the past by the sinister Sharaku. Finding that the girl in his vision is the imprisoned Empress Sapphire, Rock swears to help her win back her freedom and people.

Voiced by Junichi Takeoka

Astro Boy as "Adam": A young boy who is Doctor Narzenkopf's youngest son who is accompanying him on the Marine Express. He acts as though everything around him is new and unusual, with a sense of awe in his eyes. He has a strong drawing to Milly, the only other child on the train, but her father, Director Credit, insists that the two of them stay far apart.

However, Adam's past is actually far more distressing than it would appear. Adam is not actually a human, but a robot built by Doctor Narzenkopf for one purpose and one purpose only: to destroy the Marine Express by sacrificing himself. Knowing that he is built for the sole purpose of destroying the train leaves Adam conflicted, though he eventually fulfills his role in the end to defeat Sharaku.

Voiced by Mari Shimizu

Hosuke Sharaku as himself: A tyrannical dictator who is holding the Empress of the Mu Empire, Sapphire, hostage as he rules the island country with an iron fist. Utilizing advanced, almost alien-like, technology and his own sorcery, he intends to expand his rule beyond the island and into the farthest reaches of time and space with the Marine Express as a vehicle for his diabolical schemes.

Voiced by Kaneta Kimotsuki

Don Dracula as "Dondora": The bumbling, yet very aristocratical, vampire who is Sharaku's right-hand man. While incompetent, he always acts and speaks as if he were some kind of royalty.

Voiced by Kōichi Chiba

Princess Sapphire as herself: The Empress of the Mu Empire who has been imprisoned by the evil Sharaku. Her only hope comes in the form of Leo, a magical white lion who is her only solace that someday she and her people will be free. When the Marine Express arrives due to Sharaku's temporal tamperings, she is joined by many of the passengers who wish to help her free her people from Sharaku's rule. During this time, she and Rock form a special relationship.

Voiced by Yoshiko Ōta

Leo as himself: A magical white lion that is devoted to help Sapphire. Capable of flying, he joins with the passengers of the Marine Express to thwart Sharaku's plans.

== Production ==
Staff
Chief director	Satoshi Dezaki
Original plan	Osamu Tezuka
Planning	Akira Yoshikawa (Nippon Television Network); Tadahiko Tsuzuki (Nippon Television Network)
Executive producer	Michitoshi Shimakata
Producers	Hidehiko Takei (Nippon Television Network); Satoru Yamamoto (Tezuka Productions)
Music selection	Seiji Suzuki
Theme song composer	Yuji Ohno
Theme song singer	Tommy Snyder
Art director	Mitsunari Makino
General animation director	Shigetaka Kiyoyama
Character design	Osamu Tezuka
Color coordination	Tsutomu Tsukada
Editing	Kazuo Inoue

== See also ==
- Osamu Tezuka
- List of Osamu Tezuka anime
- Osamu Tezuka's Star System
- Astro Boy
- Black Jack
- Don Dracula
- Jungle Emperor Leo
- Metropolis
- Princess Knight
- The Three-Eyed One
- Astro Boy: Omega Factor
- Mu
