= Kazue Ikura =

Japanese actress

- 伊倉 一恵
- Born: March 23, 1959 (age 67); Ueda, Nagano Prefecture, Japan
- Occupations: Actress; voice actress; narrator
- Years active: 1979–present
- Agent: Aoni Production
- Height: 155 cm (5 ft 1 in)

Kazue Ikura (伊倉 一恵, Ikura Kazue; born March 23, 1959) is a Japanese actress, voice actress and narrator who works for Aoni Production. She was previously affiliated with theater groups/production companies 劇舎燐, 俳協, Production Baobab and NABEYA.

She is most known for the roles of Kaori Makimura (City Hunter), Toraoh (Mashin Eiyuuden Wataru), Ryuunosuke Natsume (All Purpose Cultural Cat Girl Nuku Nuku), and Leni Milchstrasse (Sakura Wars). Kazue Ikura has even taken her voice acting skills on stage to perform, in costume, Leni Milchstrasse during several events starting in 1998 to the present.

== Filmography ==
=== Television animation ===
- City Hunter (1987–1991) (Kaori Makimura)
- The Adventures of Peter Pan (1989) (Tootles)
- The Three-Eyed One (1990) (Sharaku Hosuke)
- Ranma ½ (1992) (Satori)
- Sailor Moon (1995) (Natsumi Ichinose)
- City Hunter: The Secret Service (1996) (Kaori Makimura)
- City Hunter: Goodbye My Sweetheart (1997) (Kaori Makimura)
- Detective Conan (1998) (Kaori)
- All Purpose Cultural Cat Girl Nuku Nuku (1998) (Natsume Ryunosuke)
- City Hunter: Death of the Vicious Criminal Ryo Saeba (1999) (Kaori Makimura)
- Crayon Shin-chan (1999) (Ryuko Fukazume)
- Sakura Wars (2000) (Leni Milchstrasse)
- Detective Conan (2001) (Yuki Togawa)
- Kirby of the Stars (2002) (Broom King)
- Angel Heart (2005) (Kaori Makimura)
- One Piece (2004) (Jessica)
- One Piece (2006) (Tony Tony Chopper (substitute for Ikue Ōtani))
- Black Lagoon (2006) (Garcia)
- One Piece (2009) (Sentomaru)
- Naruto Shippuden (2012) (Mebuki Haruno)
- Cutie Honey Universe (2018) (Octo Panther)

Unknown date

- Captain Tsubasa (Teppei Kisugi, Yoshiko Fujisawa)
- Tanoshii Moomin Ikka (Toft)
- Hime-chan's Ribbon (Pokota)
- Slayers (Hellmaster Phibrizzo)
- Sorcerous Stabber Orphen (Vulcan)
- Soreike! Anpanman (Shiratama-san)
- Robin Hood no Dai Boken (Robin Hood/Robert Huntington)

=== OVA ===
- Mobile Suit Gundam 0083: Stardust Memory (1991) (Mora Bascht)
- RG Veda (1991) (Ashura)
- Sukeban Deka (1991) (Saki Asamiya)
- All Purpose Cultural Cat Girl Nuku Nuku (1992) (Natsume Ryunosuke)
- Godzilland (1994/1996) (Mothra)

Unknown date

- Sakura Wars (Leni Milchstrasse)

=== Theatrical animation ===
- Mobile Suit Gundam: Char's Counterattack (1988) (Rezin Schnyder)
- City Hunter: .357 Magnum (1989) (Kaori Makimura)
- City Hunter: Bay City Wars (1990) (Kaori Makimura)
- City Hunter: Million Dollar Conspiracy (1990) (Kaori Makimura)
- Sailor Moon SuperS Plus: Ami's First Love (1995) (Bonnone)
- City Hunter The Movie: Shinjuku Private Eyes (2019) (Kaori Makimura)
- City Hunter The Movie: Angel Dust (2023) (Kaori Makimura)

Unknown date

- Doraemon: Nobita and the Galaxy Super-express (Conductor)
- Mobile Suit Gundam F91 (Bertuo Rodriguez)
- Mobile Suit Gundam 0083: The Last Blitz of Zeon (Mora Bascht)
- Naruto the Movie: Road to Ninja (Mebuki Haruno)
- One Piece: Giant Mecha Soldier of Karakuri Castle (Tony Tony Chopper)

=== Video games ===
- Tengai Makyō II: Manjimaru (1992) (Manjimaru)
- Sakura Wars 2 (1998) (Leni Milchstrasse)
- Ape Escape (1999) (Hiroki)

Unknown date

- BS Fire Emblem: Akaneia Senki (Richard)
- League of Legends (Teemo)
- R's Study (Rの書斎, R no Shosai) (Narrator, Valley Women's Division High School Minister of Housewives, Chief Publisher's Wife, and Hideko)
- Shin Megami Tensei: Digital Devil Saga (Jinana)
- Super Robot Wars series (Rezin Schnyder)
- Tales of Eternia (Shizel)
- Tales of Vesperia (Shizel)

=== Tokusatsu ===
- Taiyo Sentai Sun Vulcan (1981) (Puppeteer) (Actor) (ep. 27)
- Kamen Rider Black RX (1989) (100 Eyed Baaa (ep. 41))
- Kyoryu Sentai Zyuranger (1992) (Monster Goda) (Ep. 39)
- Ultraman Tiga (1997) (Irudo)
- Moero!! Robocon (1999) (voice of Robocon)

=== Dubbing roles ===
==== Live-action ====
- Die Hard with a Vengeance (1998 Fuji TV edition) (Raymond (Aldis Hodge))
- Kit Kittredge: An American Girl (Miss Lucinda Bond (Joan Cusack))
- L.A. Law (Grace Van Owen)
- Nicky Larson et le Parfum de Cupidon (Skippy's wife (Audrey Lamy))
- Painted Faces (Child Samo)

==== Animation ====
- Chowder (Truffles)
- Clifford the Big Red Dog (Cleo)
- Garfield's Pet Force (Vetvix)
- A Troll in Central Park (Gus)
