= Mitsume ga Tōru (video game) =

1992 video game

- Developer: Natsume
- Publisher: Tomy
- Composer: Hiroyuki Iwatsuki
- Platform: Family Computer
- Release: JP: July 17, 1992
- Genre: 2D action platformer
- Mode: Single-player

Mitsume ga Tooru (三つ目がとおる, Mitsume ga tōru; "The Three-Eyed One") is a video game for the Family Computer that was developed by Natsume and published by Tomy. It is based on the eponymous manga and anime called The Three-Eyed One. The main character is Hosuke Sharaku. There is also a Mitsume ga Tōru game for the original MSX with the same name, which was released by Natsume two years before it was released for the Famicom.

== Premise ==
The player controls Hosuke Sharaku, the last of the Three-Eyed One. The game's beginning introduces another Three-Eyed One called Prince Godaru, riding on the ancient tank Gomorrah. Godaru destroys a part of the city and kidnaps Sharaku's friend, Wato Chiyoko. The rest of the game's plot consists of Sharaku clearing several areas in 5 levels to find Chiyoko and Godaru and defeat the enemies in his way. The areas include a city, a jungle, a cave, an ancient pyramid, an abandoned ship, and an area called the Sodom.

== Gameplay ==
The game contains five levels with different designs that feature a boss at the end of every stage. The player's character has basic movement (left, right, jump) and a weapon that shoots bullets. The player can also summon the Red Condor (Akai Kondoru (赤いコンドル)), a spear which can be used as either an attack that deals double damage to enemies, or a platform when jumped onto.

When the character defeats an enemy, either by using the Red Condor or with Shakaru's bullets, he picks up gold coins, which can be used in shops across the game for bullets with different bullet speed or damage level.

The Levels:

Level 1

Hosuke searches for his girlfriend on the streets of the city, takes a ride on the roof of a truck and has his battle in the stock yard. In the end of the level Hosuke takes on the first boss called Goblin, who can only be hit when he is caught off-guard.

Level 2

Hosuke fights in a jungle and in an extended cave full of different creatures. At the end of the level he has to defeat the giant alien plant, Borubokka.

Level 3

Hosuke must go through an ancient pyramid containing catacombs full of danger. He must avoid spikes and other fatal traps.

Level 4

Hosuke sails on a motorboat to an abandoned ship. After getting to the other end of the ship, he has to defeat a large ghost formed of dozens vicious fireflies.

Level 5

Hosuke enters the Sodom, which divides into three sub-sections. After travelling through all of the three sub-sections with three sub-bosses and riding an elevator to the surface, Hosuke fights against Gomorrah, then he finally finds Godaru, the prince of the Three-eyed ones.
