= Mitsume ga Tōru =

Manga series by Osamu Tezuka

- Cover art from the third volume of the manga Mitsume Ga Tōru; Sharaku with the Red Condor

三つ目がとおる
- Manga
- Written by: Osamu Tezuka
- Published by: Kodansha
- Magazine: Weekly Shōnen Magazine
- Original run: 7 July 1974 – 19 March 1978
- Volumes: 13
- Anime television film

Akuma Shima no Purinsu: Mitsume ga Tōru
- Directed by: Yugo Serikawa
- Produced by: Hidehiko Takei (Nippon TV); Takeshi Tamiya (Toei Doga)
- Written by: Osamu Tezuka; Haruya Yamazaki
- Music by: Kazuo Ōtani
- Studio: Toei Animation
- Original network: Nippon TV
- Released: 25 August 1985
- Runtime: 85 minutes
- Anime television series
- Directed by: Hidehito Ueda
- Produced by: Toshishige Arai (Nihon Keizaisha); Kuniaki Ōnishi (Gakken); Mitsunobu Onaga (TV Tokyo)
- Written by: Mayori Sekijima
- Music by: Toshiyuki Watanabe
- Studio: Tezuka Productions
- Original network: TV Tokyo
- Original run: 18 October 1990 – 26 September 1991
- Episodes: 48
- Video game

Mitsume ga Tōru: The Three-Eyed One Comes Here
- Developer: Natsume Co., Ltd.
- Publisher: Natsume Co., Ltd.
- Genre: 2D action platformer
- Platform: MSX
- Released: April 1989
- Video game

Mitsume ga Tōru
- Developer: Natsume Co., Ltd.
- Publisher: Tomy
- Genre: 2D action platformer
- Platform: Famicom
- Released: 1992

Mitsume ga Tōru (三つ目がとおる; "The Three-Eyed One") is a Japanese manga series written and illustrated by legendary Japanese mangaka Osamu Tezuka. It was originally serialized in Weekly Shōnen Magazine from 7 July 1974 through 19 March 1978 and was later published into thirteen tankōbon volumes by Kodansha.

In 1977, Mitsume ga Tōru tied with another Tezuka manga, Black Jack, for the Kodansha Manga Award. The manga has since spawned an animated television film, Akuma Shima no no Purinsu: Mitsume ga Tōru (悪魔島のプリンス 三つ目がとおる; "The Prince of Devil Island: The Three-Eyed One"), produced by Toei Animation for Nippon TV that aired on 25 August 1985, and five years later, an anime television series produced by Tezuka Productions, which ran on TV Tokyo for a total of 48 episodes from 18 October 1990 until 26 September 1991. The latter series adaptation was planned in the wake of the first anniversary of Tezuka's death on 9 February 1989.

The main character, Hosuke Sharaku, had had appearances outside the manga as a recurring character in Tezuka's Star System, appearing in two television films, One Million-Year Trip: Bander Book (1978) and Undersea Super Train: Marine Express (1979) respectively, and one episode of the series Blue Blink ("A Prisoner at Rose House", 1989). Sharaku also appeared in three video games: Mitsume ga Tōru: The Three-Eyed One Comes Here by Natsume Co., Ltd. on the MSX in 1989, Mitsume ga Tōru by Tomy on the NES in 1992, Astro Boy: Omega Factor by Sega on the Game Boy Advance (as Astro Boy's arch-enemy) and Astro Boy by Sega on the PlayStation 2 (as an ally to Astro Boy in a sidequest).

== Plot ==
The premise of the story revolves around the main character Hosuke Sharaku ("the Evil Prince" 悪魔のプリンス). Hosuke is the heir apparent to an ancient civilization of three-eyed superhumans who built an advanced civilization long ago. The story sees Hosuke go around solving problems (most often by his own causing) and investigating lost ruins to learn more about his origins. He is often accompanied on these deeds by his best friend Chiyoko Wato.

On a stormy night, Dr. Kenmochi was visited by a strange woman bearing a child. The woman, who had a third eye on her forehead, encourages him to take care of his child in exchange for her having a "long and prosperous life" she will want for nothing and ran off from the house. Before Kenmochi could stop her, she was hit head first by a lightning strike, and burned to a flaming cinder. Kenmochi went on to raise the child, named Sharaku, as his own. As the doctor was taking care of Sharaku, he noticed that a third eye was forming on his forehead; after the eye grew, Sharaku began to develop a high intelligence and an evil behavior beyond that of any mortal. To repel any further development from this weird desposition, Kenmochi stuck a cross-shaped bandage on his forehead shutting his third eye, and Sharaku went on to have a mostly normal childhood, bearing a dumb mind and being a strictly obedient person.

Sharaku is frequently bullied for his childishness, and as such the story is also about how he fights back when the cross-shaped bandage that covers his third eye is removed. Hidden behind the bandage is Sharaku's malicious third eye, and the boy's hidden evil genius emerges when it can see. Sharaku's rivalries with teachers or students are occasionally developed into major plot points.

To learn about his roots, Sharaku must investigate the mysterious ruins that a long lost civilization called the Three-Eyed Ones bequeathed to him. In his worldwide search, which takes both he and Wato-san to locations like Arizona, Easter Island, and Mexico, Sharaku deciphers ancient scriptures and uses gadgets he invents to help solve (or start) problems and mysteries.

Some of the story's appeal is that Osamu Tezuka, the story's author, has Sharaku investigate actual historic ruins that are shrouded in mystery and offer his own unique ideas.

== Characters ==
=== Main characters ===
- Hosuke Sharaku (写楽保介. Voiced by: Kazue Ikura)

The last survivor of the three-eyed tribe have a third eye on his forehead which gives him astronomical intellect and psychic powers. In addition, "Abutoru-Damuraru-Omunisu-Nomunisu Beru Esu Horimaku" is a phrase in three-eyed script to control the weapon Red Condor.
His name sounds simply like the Japanese pronunciation of Sherlock Holmes. If his third eye is covered, he becomes a very likeable, nice, clueless little kid.

- Chiyoko Wato (和登千代子. Voiced by: Naoko Matsui)

A classmate of Sharaku who plays as his best friend, mother figure, and love interest. Commonly, she is nicknamed as "Wato-san" (和登さん). She is a self-confident, tomboyish and somewhat violent high school girl. She frequently refers to herself with the Japanese male pronoun 'boku'. Her name is a reference to the assistant of Sherlock Holmes, Watson. She often plays a huge role in thwarting Sharaku's plans for world domination.

- Dr. Kenmochi (犬持教授. Voiced by: Shunsuke Shima)

The adoptive father of Sharaku.

- Higeoyaji (ヒゲオヤジ. Voiced by: Kenichi Ogata)

The owner of a Tokyo ramen shop and a good friend of Kenmochi.
Higeoyaji has had to do a fair amount of caring for Sharaku, who can't be left alone when his father is away. Sharaku occasionally helps out in the ramen shop, but his distractable nature and clumsiness usually make more trouble for Higeoyaji. His nickname means 'mustached old man' in English. He is part of the Tezuka Star System as Shunsaku Ban, a famous detective.

- Police Inspector Unmei "Heppoko Inspector" (雲名警部. Voiced by: Kazuo Kumakura)

A Star System character based on Ludwig van Beethoven, Unmei is a frequent guest in both manga and anime versions of Mitsume ga Tōru. He is a police chief, and is one of the characters who has seen Sharaku as the Three-Eyed One in action. Not much is known about his past or his personality, but he appears to be very dedicated to his work and cool in a crisis.

=== Other characters ===
- Sharaku's Mother (Voiced by: Gara Takashima)

The woman who spawned Sharaku; she was the stranger who left the infant Sharaku under Kenmochi's care in exchange for nothing else and ran away from them, only to immediately be killed head first by a lightning strike. Like his son after her, she has a third eye on her forehead.

- Saburō Kidō (Voiced by: Shō Hayami)

The leader of the bad group study at the same school of Sharaku and Wato. For bullying Sharaku in early.

- Osamu (Voiced by: Megumi Tano)

Osamu is an anime-only character based on Tezuka Osamu. He is Sharaku's classmate, and is portrayed as a nervous sort who likes to keep himself out of trouble. At times it has been indicated that Osamu (like the rest of his male classmates) may be interested in Wato romantically. He wears thick, round glasses and has a bulbous nose, and when in uniform is usually seen wearing his black student cap.

- Takashi (Voiced by: Akira Ishida)

While featuring occasionally in the manga, Takashi is seen far more often in the anime in Sharaku's small circle of friends. He is a little more quick to action, but is meek as well, preventing him from helping Sharaku much when he's being picked on. Takashi has beady black eyes and is fairly tall. He and Osamu are good friends.

- Bankara (Voiced by Toshiharu Sakurai)

His real name is Bando To Saburo. Captain of the judo club.- A member of the Judo Club, Bankara is Sharaku's classmate and could be considered a member of Kido's group, but truthfully he likes Sharaku and tries to protect him. He is one of the few people who know about Sharaku's Three-Eyed personality. Bankara is tall and heavyset with short black hair, and wears his student cap frayed.

- Skunk Kusai (Voiced by: Fumihiko Tachiki)

Claiming to Newkirk University professors, but he is actually a thief. He appeared in Astro Boy, most "famously" as the villain in such and in Mitsume ga Tōru where he reprises the same role.

- Bumpuku Fukutaro (Voiced by: Yusaku Yara)

Man of mystery that haunts Sharaku. He appeared in the episode "The Villain Bumpuku Appears".

- Noble (Voiced by: Nozomu Sasaki)

Keeper of the Lake Biwia. Uses super powers in the fight against goblins in the anime, he died from exhaustion after Sharaku told him that he loves Wato.

- Garon (Voiced by: Unshō Ishizuka)
- Aira, Moegi (Voiced by: Yuri Amano)

A three-eyed mysterious girl who knows the clue of the plant Bolbocc.

- Pogo, Bogota, Bokor, Ruby (Voiced by: Miyuki Sanae)

A monkey who can speak human language. She is yearning Sharaku, and help him.

- Ancient Prince Godaru (Voiced by: Kazue Ikura)

An ancestor of Sharaku. He is the Prince of Lemuria Kingdom, with a cruel outrageous personality. He possesses the body of Wato, but it is two-eyed, which doesn't give him much power and so he wants to possess the body of Sharaku.

- Princess Shiguana (Voiced by: Naoko Matsui)

The wife of Godaru and ancestor of Wato. Eventually sealed in the pot the soul dissolved the body of Godaru.

- Moa (Voiced by: Ikue Ōtani)

Originally an egg left under Sharaku's care when its mother, a Giant Moa (an extinct species unique to New Zealand) was killed, the little Moa hatched and began living with him. She (gender is ambiguous, but appears to be female) is quite intelligent and loves Sharaku, though Wato isn't fond of the bird. Moa has the ability to fly; though her species has no wings, she can charge up her backside and fly like a rocket when need be.
When she is older, she is capable of carrying people while flying. Very playful and vocal (though she cannot speak human languages), Moa also has a soft spot for Higeoyaji's gyoza dumplings.

== Staff ==
The following staff is the anime series of 1990.

- Director: Hidehito Ueda
- Series composition: Mayori Sekijima
- Scenario: Mayori Sekijima, Nobuaki Kishima, Toshihisa Arakawa
- Character design: Kazuhiko Udagawa
- Music: Toshiyuki Watanabe
- Sound director: Satoshi Katō
- Animation director: Kazuhiko Udagawa, Eiji Uemura, Teruo Handa, Toshi Shishikura
- Art director: Kazuo Okada
- Producer: Toshishige Arai (Nihon Keizaisha), Kuniaki Ōnishi (Gakken), Mitsunobu Onaga (TV Tokyo)
- Planning: Takamasa Matsuya (Tezuka Productions), Hideki Furuoka (Gakken), Susumu Gotōda (Nihon Keizaisha)

== Theme songs ==
Opening theme

1. Boomerang of Hatena (はてなのブーメラン, Hatena no būmeran)
  - Singer: Tomoko Tokugaki
  - Lyricist: Kumiko Aoki
  - Composer: Yasuo Kosugi
  - Arranger: Kazuo Nobuta

Ending theme

1. Adhesive Plaster with a Little Magic (ちょっと魔法でばんそうこ, Chotto mahō de bansōko) (eps 1 – 47)
  - Singer: Anna Nakajima
  - Lyricist: Kayoko Fuyumori
  - Composer: Gōji Tsuno
  - Arranger: Kazuo Nobuta
2. Friend (Friend, Furendo) {final (48th) episode}
  - Singer: CHIEMY
  - Lyricist: Kumiko Aoki
  - Composer: Yasuo Kosugi
  - Arranger: Saburō Makino

== Episodes ==
No.	Title	Original release date
1	"The Three-Eyed One Is Here! I'm Sharaku"; Transliteration: "mittsume toujou BOKU ga sharaku da" (Japanese: 三つ目登場・ボクが写楽だ)	18 October 1990
2	"Ramen War! An Angry Blow"; Transliteration: "RAAMEN sensou ! ikari no ichigeki" (Japanese: ラーメン戦争!怒りの一撃)	25 October 1990
3	"The Cute Little Babies Are Invaders"; Transliteration: "kawaii akachan wa shinrya ku sha" (Japanese: かわいい赤ちゃんは侵略者)	1 November 1990
4	"Looking for the Missing UFO"; Transliteration: "maigo no UFO wo sagase" (Japanese: 迷子のUFOをさがせ)	8 November 1990
5	"Pursue the High-Tech Speeding Car"; Transliteration: "HAITEKU bousou sha wo oe" (Japanese: ハイテク暴走車を追え)	15 November 1990
6	"Are the Pretty Girls a Snake's Agents?"; Transliteration: "bishoujo wa HEBI no tsukai?" (Japanese: 美少女はヘビの使い?)	22 November 1990
7	"Sharaku is Possessed"; Transliteration: "nottorareta sharaku" (Japanese: のっとられた写楽)	29 November 1990
8	"A Three-Eyed Dog is Born"; Transliteration: "mittsume inu tanjou" (Japanese: 三つ目イヌ誕生)	6 December 1990
9	"The Secret of the Three-Rock Mountain"; Transliteration: "mittsu iwayama no himitsu" (Japanese: 三つ岩山の秘密)	13 December 1990
10	"No Kidding!? Sharaku is a Devil?"; Transliteration: "uso!? sharaku ga akuma" (Japanese: うそ!?写楽が悪魔)	20 December 1990
11	"Protect My Treasure!"; Transliteration: "mamore! BOKU no houmotsu" (Japanese: 守れ!ボクの宝物)	27 December 1990
12	"Protect the Underground Capital!"; Transliteration: "mamore! chika no to" (Japanese: 守れ!地下の都)	10 January 1991
13	"Protect the Third Eye!"; Transliteration: "mamore! dai san no me" (Japanese: 守れ!第三の目)	17 January 1991
14	"Space Power Explodes!"; Transliteration: "bakuhatsu! uchuu PAWAA" (Japanese: 爆発!宇宙パワー)	24 January 1991
15	"Psychic Power vs. Super Magic"; Transliteration: "chou nouryoku VS chou majutsu" (Japanese: 超能力VS超魔術)	31 January 1991
16	"The Legendary Monster is Discovered!"; Transliteration: "hakken! densetsu no kaibutsu" (Japanese: 発見!伝説の怪物)	7 February 1991
17	"School Entrance Examinations and Peace!?"; Transliteration: "juken sensou to heiwa!?" (Japanese: 受験戦争と平和!?)	14 February 1991
18	"The Mysterious Bird Called a Moa!!"; Transliteration: "fushigi tori MOA!!" (Japanese: 不思議鳥モア!!)	21 February 1991
19	"The Ancient Devil Awakened"; Transliteration: "kodai majin mezameru" (Japanese: 古代魔神めざめる)	28 February 1991
20	"Open Your Mind, Ancient Devil"; Transliteration: "shin wo ake kodai majin" (Japanese: 心を開け古代魔神)	7 March 1991
21	"3, 2, 1, Bang"; Transliteration: "321 DOKAAN" (Japanese: 321・ドカーン)	14 March 1991
22	"Challenge of Ozuma, the Mysterious Thief"; Transliteration: "kaitou OZUMA no chousen" (Japanese: 怪盗オズマの挑戦)	21 March 1991
23	"Mystery of the Three-Eyed Family: The Messenger from Ancient Times"; Transliteration: "mittsume zoku no nazo kodai kara no shisha" (Japanese: 三つ目族の謎 古代からの使者)	28 March 1991
24	"Mystery of the Three-Eyed Family: Secret Under the Bottom of the Lake"; Transliteration: "mittsume zoku no nazo kotei ni nemuru himitsu" (Japanese: 三つ目族の謎・湖底に眠るひみつ)	4 April 1991
25	"Mystery of the Three-Eyed Family: The Search for the Treasure"; Transliteration: "mittsume zoku no nazo zaihou wo sagashidase" (Japanese: 三つ目族の謎・財宝をさがし出せ)	11 April 1991
26	"Mystery of the Three-Eyed Family: The Secret Mission"; Transliteration: "mittsume zoku no nazo himerareta shimei" (Japanese: 三つ目族の謎・秘められた使命)	18 April 1991
27	"Sharaku in Wonderland"; Transliteration: "fushigi no kuni no sharaku" (Japanese: 不思議の国の写楽)	25 April 1991
28	"The Villain Bumpuku Appears"; Transliteration: "akutou bun fuku arawaru" (Japanese: 悪党文福あらわる)	2 May 1991
29	"The Ancient Prince Godai: Another Sharaku"; Transliteration: "kodai ouji GODARU mou hitori no sharaku" (Japanese: 古代王子ゴダル もう一人の写楽)	9 May 1991
30	"The Ancient Prince Godai: Search for the Ultimate Weapon!"; Transliteration: "kodai ouji GODARU saishuu heiki wo sagase!" (Japanese: 古代王子ゴダル 最終兵器を探せ!)	4 April 1991
31	"The Ancient Prince Godai: Activate Gomora!"; Transliteration: "kodai ouji GODARU shidou seyo! GOMORA" (Japanese: 古代王子ゴダル 始動せよ!ゴモラ)	23 May 1991
32	"The Ancient Prince Godai: The Earth Hijacking Plan"; Transliteration: "kodai ouji GODARU chikyuu nottori keikaku" (Japanese: 古代王子ゴダル 地球乗っ取り計画)	30 May 1991
33	"The Ancient Prince Godai: Get Back the Soul!"; Transliteration: "kodai ouji GODARU tamashii wo torimodose!" (Japanese: 古代王子ゴダル 魂を取り戻せ!)	6 June 1991
34	"Bumpuku Reappears"; Transliteration: "bun fuku saibi arawaru" (Japanese: 文福再びあらわる)	13 June 1991
35	"The Wearied Plant Bolbocc: The Seven Pillars Appear!"; Transliteration: "kaishokubutsu BORUBOKKU shutsugen! nana hon no hashira" (Japanese: 怪植物ボルボック 出現!七本の柱)	20 June 1991
36	"The Wearied Plant Bolbocc: Moegi, the Mysterious Girl"; Transliteration: "kaishokubutsu BORUBOKKU fushigi shoujo MOEGI" (Japanese: 怪植物ボルボック 不思議少女モエギ)	4 July 1991
37	"The Wearied Plant Bolbocc: The Shadow Lurking Underground"; Transliteration: "kaishokubutsu BORUBOKKU chitei ni hisomu kage" (Japanese: 怪植物ボルボック 地底にひそむ影)	11 July 1991
38	"The Wearied Plant Bolbocc: The Land Starts to Move"; Transliteration: "kaishokubutsu BORUBOKKU ugokidashita daichi" (Japanese: 怪植物ボルボック 地底にひそむ影)	18 July 1991
39	"The Wearied Plant Bolbocc: Showdown! Sharaku vs. Bolbocc"; Transliteration: "kaishokubutsu BORUBOKKU kessen! sharaku VS BORUBOKKU" (Japanese: 怪植物ボルボック 決戦!写楽VSボルボック)	25 July 1991
40	"The Easter Island Voyage: The Monkey Speaks!"; Transliteration: "IISUTAA tou koukai SARU ga shabetta!" (Japanese: イースター島航海 サルが喋った!)	1 August 1991
41	"The Easter Island Voyage: Landing on Devil Island"; Transliteration: "IISUTAA tou koukai jouriku! akuma no sumu shima" (Japanese: イースター島航海 上陸!悪魔の住む島)	8 August 1991
42	"The Easter Island Voyage: The Marriage of Pogo and Sharaku?"; Transliteration: "IISUTAA tou koukai kekkon? POGO to sharaku" (Japanese: イースター島航海 結婚?ポゴと写楽)	15 August 1991
43	"The Easter Island Voyage: Goodbye, Pogo"; Transliteration: "IISUTAA tou koukai sayounara, POGO" (Japanese: イースター島航海 さようなら、ポゴ)	22 August 1991
44	"Going After the Moa!"; Transliteration: "nerawareta MOA!" (Japanese: 狙われたモア!)	29 August 1991
45	"The Big Battle Over the Mexican Sky"; Transliteration: "MEKISHIKO joukuu dai BATORU" (Japanese: メキシコ上空大バトル)	5 September 1991
46	"The Plan to Assassinate the Moa"; Transliteration: "MOA ansatsu keikaku" (Japanese: モア暗殺計画)	12 September 1991
47	"Super Bolbocc is Revived!"; Transliteration: "fukkatsu ! SUUPAABORUBOKKU" (Japanese: 復活!スーパーボルボック)	19 September 1991
48	"Farewell, Sharaku Hosuke – A Pledge for Tomorrow"; Transliteration: "ashita e no chikai" (Japanese: 明日への誓い)	26 September 1991

== See also ==
- Mitsume ga Tōru – A NES video game issued in 1992.
- The New Adventures of Kimba The White Lion – Predecessor. The first was in October 1989, and was broadcast as a memorial project for Osamu Tezuka same as this work.
- Moomin – Preceding program. Same as this work, a program which was usually broadcast even in the Gulf War, but more known than this work.
- Moero! Top Striker – Successor. One of affected programs by the Gulf War in 1991 same as this work, the story of a multinational team appears.
