= Young Black Jack =

Japanese television series

- Cover of the first volume, released in May 2012

ヤング ブラック・ジャック (Yangu Burakku Jakku)
- Created by: Osamu Tezuka
- Manga
- Written by: Yoshiaki Tabata
- Illustrated by: Yūgo Ōkuma
- Published by: Akita Shoten
- Magazine: Young Champion
- Original run: November 22, 2011 – June 11, 2019
- Volumes: 16
- Television drama
- Directed by: Kentaro Otani
- Music by: Yoshihiro Ike
- Studio: Toho Studios; Kadokawa Daiei Studio
- Original network: Nippon TV
- Original run: April 23, 2011
- Episodes: 1
- Anime television series
- Directed by: Mitsuko Kase
- Produced by: Junichirō Tanaka; Shintarō Hashimoto; Shunichi Uemura; Mai Ichikawa; Jun Fukuda; Makoto Satō; Yasuhiro Takano; Yū Igawa
- Written by: Ryōsuke Takahashi
- Music by: Daisuke Ikeda; Hirohito Furui; Kensuke Akiyama
- Studio: Tezuka Productions
- Licensed by: NA: Sentai Filmworks
- Original network: TBS, CBC, SUN, BS-TBS
- English network: SEA: Animax
- Original run: October 1, 2015 – December 17, 2015
- Episodes: 12

Young Black Jack (Japanese: ヤング ブラック・ジャック, Hepburn: Yangu Burakku Jakku) is a Japanese manga series written by Yoshiaki Tabata and illustrated by Yūgo Ōkuma. It is based on Black Jack by Osamu Tezuka and serves as its prequel. It was serialized in Akita Shoten's Young Champion magazine between November 2011 and June 2019. An anime adaptation aired in Japan from October to December 2015. The story follows Black Jack as a medical student in the 1960s.

== Plot ==
In the 1960s, Kuroo Hazama is a gifted young medical student with a dark past who tries to make a name for himself. Despite only being a medical student, he is a brilliant surgeon and attracts attention after he completes seemingly impossible operations and displays greater skills than his formal training would allow. Hazama devotes himself to the world of medicine together with his friends, the intern Maiko Okamoto and the doctor Yabu. Set against the background of student riots, war, and corruption, Hazama finds himself caught up in a series of circumstances which challenge his integrity as a person and his path towards becoming a surgeon. The choices he makes leads him to become the legend known as Black Jack.

== Characters ==
Kuroo Hazama (間 黒男, Hazama Kuroo)
Portrayed by: Masaki Okada (live-action drama), Voiced by: Yuichiro Umehara (anime)
Yabu (藪)
Voiced by: Kōji Yusa (anime)
Maiko Okamoto (岡本 舞子, Okamoto Maiko)
Voiced by: Shizuka Itō (anime)
Tōrō Tachiiri (立入 灯郎, Tachiiri Tōrō)
Voiced by: Hiroki Tōchi (anime)
Doctor (軍医, Dokutā)
Voiced by: Junichi Suwabe (anime)
Eri Imagami (今上 エリ, Imagami Eri)
Voiced by: Aoi Yūki (anime)
Raymond (レイモンド, Reimondo)
Voiced by: Norihiro Inoue (anime)
Tomezō Kanayama (金山 留蔵, Kanayama Tomezō)
Voiced by: Kazuo Oka (anime)
Jou (ジョウ)
Voiced by: Takuya Eguchi (anime)
Aoyama (青山)
Voiced by: Megumi Toyoguchi (anime)
Tamura (田村)
Voiced by: Yoshitsugu Matsuoka (anime)
Smith (スミス)
Voiced by: Ryōtarō Okiayu (anime)
Marlon (マーロン, Māron)
Voiced by: Hisafumi Oda (anime)
Hugo (ヒューゴ, Hyūgo)
Voiced by: Shunsuke Takeuchi (anime)
Takayanagi (高柳)
Voiced by: Kentarou Tone (anime)
Bob (ボブ, Bobu)
Voiced by: Hiroki Yasumoto (anime)
Phan (ファン, Fan)
Voiced by: M.A.O (anime)
Steve (スティーブ, Sutību)
Voiced by: Shōta Yamamoto (anime)
Maruo Hyakki (百樹 丸雄, Hyakki Maruo)
Voiced by: Mamoru Miyano (anime)

== Media ==
=== Manga ===
The prequel manga based on Osamu Tesuka's Black Jack manga series is written by Yoshiaki Tabata, and illustrated by Yūgo Ōkuma. It began serialization in Akita Shoten's Young Champion issue #23 of 2011, released on November 22, and finished in the issue #13 of 2019, published on June 11. Akita Shoten published the first tankōbon volume of the manga on May 18, 2012, and sixteen volumes have been released as of August 20, 2019. In March 2017, it was announced that the manga gone on hiatus to prepare for the next arc in summer 2017. Later, the manga resumed on February 13, 2018, in the fifth issue of the main Young Champion magazine.

=== Live-action drama ===
A live-action TV special adaptation aired at April 23, 2011, at Nippon TV. The special starred lead actor Masaki Okada as young Black Jack. Kentaro Otani directed the special.

=== Anime ===
An anime television series adaptation aired from October to December 2015 on TBS, CBC, SUN, and BS-TBS. Produced by Tezuka Productions, it is directed by Mitsuko, with Ryōsuke Takahashi handling series composition and serving as supervisor, Miyuki Katayama and Nana Miura designing the characters and Daisuke Ikeda, Hirohito Furui and Kensuke Akiyama composing the music.

The anime has been licensed in North America by Sentai Filmworks, and was also streamed on Crunchyroll; after the acquisition of Crunchyroll by Sony Pictures Television, Young Black Jack, among several Sentai Filmworks titles, was dropped from the Crunchyroll streaming service on March 31, 2022.

==== Episode list ====
No.	Title	Directed by	Written by	Original release date
1	"Where's the Doctor?!"; Transliteration: "Isha wa doko da!" (Japanese: 医者はどこだ！)	Fumihiro Yoshimura	Mayumi Morita	October 2, 2015
After a train collides with a bus at a level crossing, dozens of injured are rushed to Hongoshi University Hospital. (Note: The university hospital's name is mentioned in episode 10.) However, the hospital is short-staffed as most of the interns are in a protest. Intern Maiko Okamoto reluctantly recruits 22-year-old medical student Kuroo Hazama (Black Jack) to help in the hospital. One of the patients from the accident is a young boy whose right arm and left leg are severed. A senior surgeon suggests amputation, but Hazama offers replantation for a fee of 5 million yen, to which the boy's parents agree. Heading to his friend Dr. Yabu's private clinic, he successfully reattaches the boy's limbs in his first-ever surgery. However, the boy's father pays only 10% of the agreed price after learning that Hazama is still a student.
2	"Abduction"; Transliteration: "Rachi" (Japanese: 拉致)	Hiromichi Matano	Mayumi Morita	October 9, 2015
Hazama, Yabu, and four other men are kidnapped by the loan shark Tachiiri, to whom they owe large debts. Tachiiri offers to clear the debts of the man who donates his heart for a transplant needed by the cult leader Tomezō Kanayama. The donor screening tests reveal two candidates: Hazama and Raymond. The rest of the men are freed, and Kanayama personally chooses Hazama to be his donor. However, when the black market surgeon that Tachiiri hired fails to show up, the cult members threaten them and Hazama is forced to perform what would be the first-ever heart transplant in Japan. Raymond, an illegal immigrant, offers his heart in exchange for money to be sent to his family for the treatment of his young daughter's leukemia. Yabu returns and assists Hazama, but tries to convince him to cancel the surgery as it will require Raymond's death. Hazama is tempted to proceed, but before he can begin, Kanayama dies from cardiac arrest. Hazama then decides to perform plastic surgery to make Raymond resemble Kanayama. As a result, Raymond survives albeit in the guise of Kanayama, and money is sent to his family allowing his daughter to recover.
3	"Deserter"; Transliteration: "Dassōhei" (Japanese: 脱走兵)	Fumio Maezono	Tōru Nozaki	October 16, 2015
Okamoto visits Hazama's apartment to learn the secret of his surgical skills. She finds out that he has been practicing on his pet fish and on cuts of pork. When they hear a groan next door, they find out that Hazama's neighbors, Tamura and Aoyama, are anti-war activists sheltering two American deserters avoiding the Vietnam War. One of the deserters, Smith, is suffering from a severe headache. In an OB/GYN clinic owned by Tamura's family, Hazama diagnoses a cerebral edema and insists that Smith should undergo emergency treatment in a proper hospital. The activists pressure Hazama into treating Smith, but he is unmoved. However, he is suddenly haunted by his conscience and changes his mind, performing a decompressive craniectomy with the help of Okamoto. After Smith awakens, Hazama is arrested, as the former is actually a CIA operative monitoring deserters and their accomplices. The CIA covers up the incident and frees Hazama, who ponders why he risked his future career to save someone he did not know.
4	"In Vietnam Part 1"; Transliteration: "Betonamu nite sono 1" (Japanese: ベトナムにて その1)	Kenichi Nishida	Tōru Nozaki	October 23, 2015
Hazama travels to South Vietnam after Yabu went missing there. A month earlier, Yabu moved to Saigon to restart his medical career, but two weeks after his arrival, the hospital he worked at was bombed by terrorists. Hazama meets with photojournalist Takayanagi, the man who referred Yabu to the hospital, who tells him that Yabu's last known whereabouts is a village called Da Lat. Takayanagi invites Hazama to join him in the American military convoy heading to Da Lat. They board an armored personnel carrier with the convoy's commander, U.S. Army officer Bob, as well as the Vietnamese guide and interpreter Phan. On the way, they are ambushed by the Viet Cong and in the midst of firefight, Hazama attends to Steve, a wounded soldier. However, they are all captured by the Viet Cong.
5	"In Vietnam Part 2"; Transliteration: "Betonamu nite sono 2" (Japanese: ベトナムにて その2)	Yorifusa Yamaguchi	Tōru Nozaki	October 30, 2015
Hazama and his companions are tortured and imprisoned by the Viet Cong for several days. When Phan is taken out to be tortured, a guerrilla slips her a key. The group escapes through the jungle, and Phan explains that the guerrilla's friend was recently saved by a Japanese doctor—possibly Yabu. The escapees faint from exhaustion, but are rescued by villagers and brought to Yabu's clinic where the two friends reunite. However, the wounded Steve needs urgent surgery, but the clinic lacks medical equipment. Bob arranges for a U.S. Army doctor to parachute into the village. The doctor has excellent skills and technique and successfully treats Steve. The doctor and Hazama develop a rivalry but grudgingly acknowledge each other's abilities.
6	"In Vietnam Part 3"; Transliteration: "Betonamu nite sono 3" (Japanese: ベトナムにて その3)	Kenichi Maejima	Tōru Nozaki	November 6, 2015
Steve regains consciousness, but is delirious and paranoid. He wanders into the fields where he is killed by a land mine. Steve's death causes Bob to become mentally unstable, and he becomes angry and vengeful when the villagers and doctors attend to a badly wounded guerrilla—the one who helped them escape and is revealed to be Phan's childhood friend. Judging their actions as traitorous, Bob calls for an airstrike on the village. The villagers evacuate, but the three doctors continue the surgery despite the impending attack, with Hazama and the doctor developing respect for each other's skills. The doctors manage to finish the operation just before the bombs drop. Afterwards, they part ways: Hazama returns to Japan while Yabu remains in Vietnam. They both realize that they never knew the army doctor's name, who is revealed to be Kiriko.
7	"Painless Revolution Part 1"; Transliteration: "Kutsū naki kakumei sono 1" (Japanese: 苦痛なき革命 その1)	Shinichi Shōji	Tomoko Konparu	November 13, 2015
Hazama and Okamoto, along with other interns, are in Chicago to observe the surgeries of Dr. Risenberg, a renowned expert. They encounter Okamoto's old friend Tiara and her friend, the civil rights activist Johnny Bassett. Later, two Black Power activists attempt to recruit Johnny into their cause, but he remains committed to nonviolence. Johnny is beaten up while Tiara is accidentally shot. They are both brought to the hospital where Risenberg operates on Johnny's fractured arm, assisted by Hazama and Okamoto. After the surgery, Hazama diagnoses Johnny with congenital analgesia—based on his delayed reaction to his injury, and his reputation of tolerating police beatings during protests. However, Tiara reveals that Johnny could feel pain back when he was younger. Hazama offers to research for a proper diagnosis and possible cure within his three remaining days in Chicago, to which Johnny stubbornly acquiesces. Meanwhile, Yabu and his patient Tommy Williams arrive in Chicago.
8	"Painless Revolution Part 2"; Transliteration: "Kutsū naki kakumei sono 2" (Japanese: 苦痛なき革命 その2)	Fumio Maezono	Tomoko Konparu	November 20, 2015
Yabu and Tommy are in Chicago at the invitation of Risenberg, who is researching on PTSD and combat stress reaction—which Tommy, a Vietnam veteran, currently has; while Yabu, a World War II veteran, has recovered from. Yabu and Hazama are reunited, while Tommy reveals that he and Johnny were in the same platoon, but Johnny was never deployed to Vietnam, contradicting the latter's claim. Hazama tricks Johnny into confessing that he was part of a secret military experiment. Risenberg meets with Hugo, a CIA official, (Note: The same CIA official in episode 3.) who reveals that they tried to create soldiers who are unable to feel pain, and that the program was based on Risenberg's past work as a Nazi doctor. Hugo also admits that Johnny, Hazama, and Risenberg may be eliminated to keep the program's secrecy. Risenberg destroys Hazama's files on Johnny, then goes on to cure the latter. Hazama and Johnny are angry at Risenberg, not knowing that he saved their lives.
9	"The Gruesome Chronicle Part 1"; Transliteration: "Muzanchō sono 1" (Japanese: 無残帳 その1)	Kenichi Nishida	Mayumi Morita	November 27, 2015
Hazama meets a lecturer, Maruo Hyakki, a quadruple amputee, who was originally one of the surgeons who operated on him alongside Dr. Honma. Reference is made to the story of Dororo and Hyakkimaru by Osamu Tezuka in which Hyakkimaru lacked 48 parts of his body which was given to demons. Hazama learns of Hyakki's unfortunate fate, his research in advanced mechanical prostheses, and his plans to return as a surgeon. Hyakki wants to have the new prostheses implanted on his body, but can't find anyone willing, and so Hazama risks his future career by offers to do it himself. The surgery is successful and Hyakki proceeds to rebuild his reputation, gaining a request to do an operation by his former institution, Teito University. However, the plan is cancelled after being sabotaged by the circulation of photographs of him carrying out an autopsy wearing his prostheses. Shaken, Hyakki goes to bid his friend professor Takara goodbye, only to overhear him talking with Professor Tano indicating they were behind the sabotage.
10	"The Gruesome Chronicle Part 2"; Transliteration: "Muzanchō sono 2" (Japanese: 無残帳 その2)	Yorifusa Yamaguchi	Mayumi Morita	December 4, 2015
Police find a car that has crashed through a guardrail and burst into flames, incinerating the driver but his left arm was noticeably missing. Hyakki is coincidentally missing in action and takes a family sword named Hyakkimaru to be reforged. Meanwhile Miyo reveals that her wedding reception reservation with Hyakki has been cancelled, Detective Ban reveals to Takara that the dead driver was Professor Tano. Hyakki tracks down Takara and reveals that he killed Tano who said that Takara was behind the accident which made him a quadriplegic. Hyakki then severs Takara's left arm. Hazama and Okamoto find Takara on the street bleeding to death, and they perform a quick ligation of the brachial artery to save him. Hyakki later finds Professor Sabame on the rooftop of a building and cuts off his leg, leaving him to bleed to death. Takara wakes up three days later in the hospital and after Detective Ban informs him of Sabame's death, Takara has a nervous breakdown. Ban informs Hazama, Okamoto, and Miyo that Hyakki's motive for the attacks is related to how Director Daigou's faction forced Hyakki out of the University. However, Hazama suspects that there is another reason for the murders. Hazama tracks Hyakki to an old temple filled with statues of demons in the forest, and is shocked at the change in Hyakki's character.
11	"The Gruesome Chronicle Part 3"; Transliteration: "Muzanchō sono 3" (Japanese: 無残帳 その3)	Hiromichi Matano	Mayumi Morita	December 11, 2015
Hyakki divulges to Hazama that Takara and his associates were part of Assistant Director Kagemitsu Daigo's faction at the university, but when Daigo was involved funds mismanagement, control was transferred to Assistant Director Meio's faction which included Hyakki. Daigo's faction planned to discredit Meio by making him miss an important scheduled operation by sabotaging his car to delay him. However, Meio took ill and sent Hyakki instead, but the mechanic had tampered with the brakes and thus Hyakki was involved in his career-ending accident. Shortly afterwards, Meio died of his illness and Daigo became Director. Hyakki leaves the temple and attacks Daigo in his office, succeeding in severing Daigo's left leg. Hazama asks Takara to confess to the conspiracy, but Takara blames Hazama for giving Hyakki the ability to seek revenge. Hazama finds the injured Hyakki and patches him up, repairing his right eye in the process. Hyakki is eventually apprehended and is sentenced to death, but escapes jail thanks to a robotic eye implant Hazama had fitted to him. Some time later while still a student, Hazama secretly accepts money to replace a surgeon during an operation. Hyakki unexpected visits Hazama, noting the illegal path he has now chosen. Hazama replies that he understands the ruthless nature of the medical field, and is willing to become an enemy of the law to save patients
12	"The Season of Mania"; Transliteration: "Kyōsō no kisetsu" (Japanese: 狂騒の季節)	Fumio Maezono	Mayumi Morita	December 18, 2015
Hazama continues to accept money from Tachiiri for operating illegally. One day, he comes across an anti-war protest and assists a young girl who sprains her ankle. He recognizes her as Eri Imagami whom he treated some time earlier when he relieved a cerebral edema on the deserter, Smith. Hazama applies first-aid to some of the other protesters and again sees Aoyama from that time. Later, Hazama receives a postcard from Eri who is undertaking training with militant revolutionaries in the mountains of Gunma and decides to visit her. Hazama arrives and is shocked to see Imagami suffering from a beating and Aoyama also beaten and tied up after wanting to quit. Hazama is also taken prisoner, but when Imagami has a seizure from her injuries, the rebel leader relents and allows Hazama to treat her and he operates all night, fixing a hemothorax, rib fractures, nose and orbital fractures, and an injured liver. Suddenly, police surround the cabin and fire smoke grenades to cloud the rebels' vision. Eri staggers outside to stop the confrontation, but she is shot in the chest and falls into the snow. Hazama tells the dying girl that he will fix her again as she dies in his arms. After his graduation, Hazama repays his debts to Tachiiri who offers him more black market deals, but Hazama declines, saying that those jobs will come to him anyway. This is the beginning of Hazama's transformation into Black Jack.
