= Hosuke Sharaku =

Fictional Character

- Osamu Tezuka's Star System character
- Hosuke Sharaku in the 1990 anime The Three-Eyed One
- First appearance: Weekly Shōnen Magazine #28 (July 7, 1974)
- Created by: Osamu Tezuka
- Voiced by: Kaneta Kimotsuki (One Million-Year Trip: Bander Book and Undersea Super Train: Marine Express); Toshiko Fujita (The Prince of Devil Island: The Three-Eyed One); Kazue Ikura (The Three-Eyed One); Motoko Kumai (The Last Mystery of the 20th Century); Miki Itō (Astro Boy (2003)); Yuuko Satou (Black Jack); Miyuki Sawashiro (Buddha 2)

In-universe information
- Aliases: "The Three-Eyed One" "The Evil Prince"; Three Eyes; Dr. Sharaku (One Million-Year Trip: Bander Book); Prince Sharaku (Blue Blink)
- Species: Human
- Gender: Male
- Occupation: Student
- Family: Dr. Kenmochi (adopted father)
- Significant other: Chiyoko Wato (classmate)
- Relatives: Mother (deceased); Prince Godaru (ancestor) (deceased)
- Nationality: Japanese

Hosuke Sharaku (Japanese: 写楽保介, Hepburn: Sharaku Hōsuke) is the main character of Osamu Tezuka's manga and anime The Three-Eyed One (Mitsume ga Tōru). The names "Sharaku Hosuke" and "Wato-san" are references to Sherlock Holmes and Watson. Hosuke Sharaku is part of Osamu Tezuka's Star System.

== Description ==
Sharaku is a seemingly innocent junior high student with a secret. On his forehead is a third eye that, if open, reveals his extraordinary psychic powers and diabolical personality. It also renders him able to summon a red, spear-like wand called the Red Condor. Sharaku is, as the story goes, the last descendant of the mysterious ancient race of the Three-Eyed Ones, who were responsible for constructing many wonders of the ancient world.

To protect mankind from his terrible power, he is made to wear a bandage that seals his third eye. While his third eye is sealed, Sharaku knows nothing of his true nature or of his power, and does not remember his evil half's sinister attempts to conquer the world. Sharaku is helped and nurtured by his classmate, Chiyoko Wato (和登千代子, Wato Chiyoko), who is drawn to his true nature. Wato is one of the few human beings that Sharaku initially feels that he can trust.

== Prominent Roles ==
- "Hosuke Sharaku" in The Three-Eyed One
- "Assaji" in Buddha
- "Ancient Prince Sharaku" in Undersea Super Train: Marine Express - 1979 anime
- "Dr. Sharaku" in One Million-Year Trip: Bander Book - 1978
- "Prince Sharaku" in Blue Blink.

Two games were created based on The Three-Eyed One, one for the MSX, the other for the Family Computer called Mitsume ga Tōru, with Sharaku as the main character.

He also appears as the main villain of the Game Boy Advance game Astro Boy: Omega Factor, where he is the cruel prince of the Mu empire who confronts Astro Boy. His appearance in the game is based on the Osamu Tezuka film Marine Express.

Additionally, he makes several appearances in Black Jack, most noticeably in the 2004 TV animated adaptation, in which he's a normal junior high schooler and has a crush on Black Jack's assistant Pinoko. Chiyoko Wato appears as his older sister and a kendo practitioner.

== See also ==
- List of Osamu Tezuka anime
- List of Osamu Tezuka manga
