= Phoenix 2772 =

- Theatrical release poster
- 火の鳥2772愛のコスモゾーン
- Directed by: Osamu Tezuka (Note: Chief Director (総監督)); Taku Sugiyama
- Screenplay by: Osamu Tezuka; Taku Sugiyama
- Story by: Osamu Tezuka (Note: Composition (構成))
- Based on: Phoenix by Osamu Tezuka
- Cinematography: Ban Yamaki (Note: Although there are several companies and people credited for Photography (撮影) in the ending credits, Yamaki's name is the only one introduced in the opening credits.)
- Edited by: Kazuo Inoue
- Music by: Yasuo Higuchi
- Production company: Tezuka Productions
- Distributed by: Toho Co., Ltd.
- Release date: 15 February 1980 (Japan)
- Running time: 121 minutes
- Country: Japan

Phoenix 2772 (火の鳥2772 愛のコスモゾーン, Hi no Tori 2772: Ai no Kosumozōn; lit. 'Firebird 2772: Love's Cosmozone') is a 1980 Japanese animated science fiction fantasy drama film directed and written by Osamu Tezuka and Taku Sugiyama. The film is based on Tezuka's manga series Phoenix.

== Plot ==
Phoenix 2772 is set in the distant future where the planet Earth is dying from a lack of energy resources and a subjugating political climate sees all human beings produced in test tubes and their roles in society selected by computers, from pilot to politician, etc. Godo is one such child brought up to be a cadet and nursed by a beautiful robot-maid Olga. After noticing his exceptional abilities, Rock, a dictatorial candidate for prime minister, selects Godo to fulfil his agenda and travel into deep space and capture the mystical Phoenix – its blood will manifestly heal the Earth, but Rock out of selfishness wants this to make him both prime minister and immortal by drinking its blood. The assignment troubles Godo partly because he has a love of all living creatures and he detests being trained to be a ruthless space hunter. He is told he will also have to leave his best friend Olga behind and that she will be destroyed. Most importantly he is romantically involved with Rena, daughter of Lord Eat (an "elite") and bride-to-be of Rock which is forbidden for his rank to be involved with such a woman.

Godo and Rena are caught together and for his crime, Godo loses his citizenship and is sent to a labour camp in Iceland where energy from the Earth's mantle is being harnessed in a bid to solve the world's energy shortage (but is causing instability between the mantle and Earth's crust and serious long term harm to the planet therefore). While interned and heart-broken over losing Rena, Godo meets Doctor Saruta, a prison professor who wishes to tutor the young pilot, only to secretly plot with him a plan to escape and search for the Phoenix themselves to save the Earth. After a serious earthquake causes chaos and destruction in the facility, Godo is saved by Olga and Pincho (a pet creature of Rena that had helped Olga and found out where Godo had been taken), and they set of into space by stealing a "Space Shark" ship that Godo would have been given in his mission to capture the Phoenix.

After stopping at a planet and meeting Saruta's hermit friend Ban, Godo and the crew of the ship track the Phoenix but find it impossibly powerful and it changes into many monstrous shapes and sizes, from dragons, tentacular leeches and even mimicking a small planet. After learning that Rena has married Rock, Godo had become stricken with misery and pushes away Olga's advances when she shows signs of love for Godo (and previously jealousy for Rena). With the crew all killed one-by-one by the Phoenix and the secret of its weakness lost in Saruta's last words, the Phoenix finally destroys Olga by burning her. Godo is broken and forgets the Phoenix as he cradles the blackened metal body of Olga, realizing how selfish he had been towards his life-long and devoted companion. The Phoenix tries to attack the ship but is repelled each time it gets close by the power of Godo's love and the giant vengeful form dissolves with the bird then appearing inside the ship in a more feminine, peacock-like form.

Admiring the power of Godo's love of living creatures, the Phoenix, speaking to Godo through telepathy "speaking to his heart" admits he is too strong for her and offers to grant his wish of reviving Olga on the condition he gives her something she wants of him (not revealing that this is his love and that the Phoenix inhabits the body of the restored Olga to obtain this). After being reunited with Olga and given a paradisaical planet to live on, Godo still has feelings towards the dying Earth and sets out to return with vegetables and resources, only to be met with Rock (and a now content Rena) and is arrested. What follows is a series of catastrophic earthquakes that level the whole world and bring about final destruction, Rena dying in the advent by trying to escape on Godo's ship and Rock blinded by a lava emission. Godo gives Rock his last rites and he and Olga stand together on a beach contemplating the impending death of the planet.

Godo is so distraught that the Phoenix reveals itself to him through Olga and in an attempt to console him, says he can live forever if he drinks the Firebird's blood and wait the many centuries for the earth's eventual revival. Godo instead offers his life for the revival of the Earth. The Phoenix agrees, admiring Godo's selfless nature despite her own wish that he stay alive. After saying their fondest farewells, Godo collapses, dead into Olga's arms. Olga lays Godo's body on the shore and then lays down beside him, the Phoenix leaves her and the two lifeless forms then transform during the earth's revival - Godo becomes a newborn baby again and Olga becomes a beautiful human woman taking the baby in her arms as her son.

== Voice cast ==
- Keiko Takeshita as Phoenix, the mythical bird.
- Kaneto Shiozawa as Godo, a pilot.
- Katsue Miwa as Olga, a female robot and Godo's caretaker.
- Shūichi Ikeda as Rock, the political leader and chief science officer.
- Toshiko Fujita as Rena, the daughter of Lord Eat.
- Kazue Takahashi as Pincho; an alien servant of Rena.
- Masatō Ibu as Black Jack, the prison warden of the labour camp in Iceland.
- Kazuo Kumakura as Dr. Saruta.
- Chikao Ohtsuka as Ban, a friend of Dr. Saruta.

== Release ==
Phoenix 2772 was released in Japan on March 15, 1980, where it was distributed by Toho. In some locations, it was shown as a double feature with the nature documentary Elephant Story. An American version of the film was released by Toho International Co., Ltd., under the title Space Firebird, with English subtitles at its full running time in July 1982.

The film was first issued to home video, in the United Kingdom by Mountain Films, at a running time of 95 minutes. The American VHS release followed five years later when it was released by Celebrity Home Entertainment, as part of its "Just for Kids" range; this release cut the film by a further ten minutes, deleting the opening sequence detailing Godo's upbringing with Olga, some sundry animation sequences and the end credits over the sunrise background. It was ultimately later re-released uncut by Best Film & Video Corp.

== Reception ==
Variety referred to the film as a "well-drawn, imaginative Japanese sci-fi feature". The review stated that the film should have been shortened by about half an hour, with scenes involving musical interludes of the pets, certain chase sequences and the climactic cataclysm of Earth be shortened or cut out. The film's animation was as "modern and often day-glo colored, with some corners cut: static backgrounds, shake and shimmer characters in place of constant, fluid movement" and that "the firebird itself figuring prominently in action scenes during later reels, is disappointing in design and out-of-place in the futuristic world".

Phoenix 2772 was the Winner of the Inkpot Award at the 1980 San Diego Comic Convention and the Animation Award at the 1st Las Vegas Film Festival the same year.

== Footnotes ==
=== References ===
- Galbraith IV, Stuart (2008). The Toho Studios Story: A History and Complete Filmography. Scarecrow Press. ISBN 978-1461673743.
- Willis, Donald, ed. (1985). Variety's Complete Science Fiction Reviews. Garland Publishing Inc. ISBN 978-0-8240-6263-7.
