= Black Jack (manga character) =

Fictional character from Black Jack

- Osamu Tezuka's Star System character
- First appearance: Black Jack, Chapter 1 (November 19, 1973)
- Created by: Osamu Tezuka
- Voiced by: Akio Ōtsuka (Original); Tomokazu Seki (young); Yūichirō Umehara (young, Young Black Jack anime); Nachi Nozawa (Marine Express, Astro Boy episode); Masatō Ibu (Million-Year Trip Bander Book, Phoenix 2772)

In-universe information
- Alias: Kurō Hazama
- Species: Human
- Gender: Male
- Occupation: Doctor; Surgeon
- Family: Pinoko (adopted daughter)
- Relatives: Kagemitsu Hazama (father) (deceased); Mio Hazama (mother) (deceased); Reika Hazama (step-mother); Shoren Hazama (half-sister); Benitokage Hazama (half-sister) (deceased); Zen Mantoku (step-grandfather) (deceased)
- Nationality: Japanese

Black Jack (ブラック・ジャック, Burakku Jakku) is a fictional character created by Osamu Tezuka, introduced in Weekly Shōnen Champion on November 19, 1973. He is the main character in the Black Jack manga franchise.

His odd appearance comes from a childhood incident, in which both he and his mother were terribly injured in an explosion. Although Kurō's mother died from her injuries, and Kurō's own body was nearly torn to shreds, he was rescued, thanks to a miraculous operation by Dr. Honma. Although Kurō survived, part of his hair turned white due to stress and shock. The skin covering the left side of Kurō's face is noticeably darker due to getting a skin graft from his best friend, who is half African. Kurō refused to have plastic surgery to match the skin color as a sign of respect for his friend. Marked by this experience, Kurō decided to become a surgeon himself, taking the name of Black Jack.

Despite his medical genius, Black Jack has chosen not to obtain a surgical license, choosing instead to operate from the shadows, free from rules and the corrupt bureaucratic establishment. Although he usually treats those he meets in chance encounters who have heard of his legendary skills, he occasionally travels to hospitals around the world to covertly assist terminally ill patients.

== Name ==
Black Jack's real name is Kurō Hazama (間 黒男, Hazama Kurō). In chapter 68, "The Most Beautiful Woman in the World" (published April 14, 1975), Black Jack explains the meaning behind both of his names: "Kurō" is written with the Japanese characters for "black" and "man;" as "Jack" is a common name for a man, he translates his name as "Black Jack." His name in the manga is spelled "Kuro'o". In Volume 10 Chapter 2: "The Mask Chosen," he explains to Pinoko that in Japanese, kuro means black and the second o represents a jack in a deck of cards.

== Character ==
Black Jack presents himself as a medical mercenary, selling his skills to whoever will pay his price. He is a shadowy figure, with a black cape, eerie black-and-white hair, and surgical scars snaking all over his body, the most prominent of which being across his face. His appearance and strange, anti-social mannerisms frighten many away from him, but his friends and acquaintances overlook his appearance and idiosyncrasies, knowing him to be principled, skilled, and above all, completely dedicated to the highest ideals of the medical profession.

Although his age is not explicitly stated, he is in his late 20s or 30s. He performs some surgeries at home where he has his own operating room, but he more typically travels the world to meet his patients. (He is able to speak multiple languages, including Spanish and English.) He is often seen driving his black car, matching his usual costume, although he also takes public transportation where he is called upon in the event of an on-board emergency.

Black Jack cures patients indiscriminately, from common folk, to presidents, to yakuza leaders, and even to supernatural beings, from the very poor to the very rich. However, he charges all of his patients shockingly large sums (from 10 million to billions of yen), sometimes even causing them to jump out of their clothes in surprise (in the manga). A colleague even names a disease after him, because of the outrageous fee he charges for the surgery. Even for those who beg for mercy, Black Jack (at least initially) refuses to lower his price. This has given him a reputation for callousness and greed, an image which he cultivates with care.

Contrary to external appearances however, Black Jack possesses a complex personal code. He will cure a patient for free if they move him with the story of their suffering; however, he always establishes a patient's willingness to pay beforehand. If Black Jack cannot discover a redeeming story behind a patient, his fee stands. He also makes exceptions in exigent circumstances, and may change his mind if proven incorrect in his assumptions. He also always ensures that his patients recover completely.

Black Jack gives much of the money he earns to charity, paying for other doctors' surgeries as well as his own, and buying up land to protect nature from commercial development. When his patient is wealthy, he usually increases his fee substantially, and often will attach non-quantifiable conditions to his services, such as an agreement to leave erstwhile victims alone, or to protect the environment. Although he gives back most of his earnings to the community, Black Jack occasionally faces robbers seeking the money they believe he hoards.

== Surgical skills ==
Black Jack is a highly skilled doctor, able to handle scalpels and other medical tools quickly and precisely. He frequently reattaches and transplants limbs, performs near-perfect cosmetic surgery, and takes on cases that other surgeons have abandoned, even when the other surgeons are widely recognized experts in their field.

Black Jack is also known to use his tools for self-defense, showing himself to be capable of clogging the barrel of a gun with a scalpel from some distance. He is also shown to be a ruthless combatant, once even strangling an attacker with surgical tubing.

Aside from his speed, precision and ingenuity, Black Jack also has extraordinary fortitude and stamina. In several chapters and episodes, he performs surgeries on himself, and on occasion performs solo operations for 24 consecutive hours. In one instance, he operates on 40 patients simultaneously.

=== Lack of medical license ===
While some doctors openly praise Black Jack's for his surgical abilities, others disdain him for not having a license. The manga explains that he lost his medical license when he went against his superiors orders and performed a surgery on his lover who had late stage ovarian cancer. His superiors had said that her illness was too far along to even bother with surgery, but he proceeded anyway and saved her life. For his insubordination and out of pure jealousy toward Black Jack for outshining them and potentially taking away their positions in the future, his superiors took away his medical license. However, since they exiled Black Jack from the medical association he has been able to excel in his medical studies and abilities thus avoiding the restrictions that other doctors must abide in. Later, when Black Jack is featured in a film, the World Medical Association objects to him being the star, and so his surgical skills are edited out of the final cut.

=== Veterinary surgery ===
There are many instances where Black Jack operates on animals. Before he completed medical school, he practiced making sutures on his own with meat from the local market and even with live fish. He ate them when he was done. Following is a partial list of animal surgeries after his finishing medical school:

- a killer whale in Volume 2 Chapter 3: "The Ballad of the Killer Whale" (Status: Dead)
- a deer in Volume 6 Chapter 11: "Nadare" (Status: Dead)
- a gorilla in Volume 7 Chapter 8: "Goribei of Senjogahara" (Status: Dead)
- a bear in Volume 7 Chapter 11: "A Hill for One" (Status: Alive)
- an Iriomote cat in Volume 9 Chapter 7: "A Question of Priorities" (Status: Alive)
- a dolphin in Volume 10 Chapter 5: "Strangers at Sea" (Status: Dead)
- a poodle in Volume 11 Chapter 5: "The Whispers of a Dog" (Status: Alive)
- a horse in Volume 17 Chapter 5: "Avatar" (Brain Status: Alive) (Body Status: Dead)
- a lion cub in the 2004 anime, Episode 7: "White Lion" (Status: Alive)

=== Supernatural encounters ===
Although Black Jack claims not to believe in supernatural phenomena in medicine, he has nevertheless brushed with the paranormal many times:

- Spirits of a plane crash (?) and a spirit hosting the boy in Volume 12 Chapter 11: "Operation of the Spirit".
- A mummy in Volume 13 Chapter 5: "The Cursed Operation".
- A female alien in Volume 13 Chapter 10: "A Challenge of the Third Kind".
- He turns a girl into a bird in Volume 17 Chapter 2: "A Girl Who Became a Bird".

== Early youth and appearance ==
Black Jack has a large patch of white hair on the right half of his head and black on the rest. His body is lined with stitches, including a particularly long one on his face. The left side of this scar on his face is a darker color than the right. He is possibly in his late 20s or 30s throughout the main story, and is often seen wearing a black overcoat.

When Black Jack was eight years old, he and his mother and father lived in an abandoned military base. Although most of the mines were removed properly, some were left behind. While passing through the minefield, he and his mother triggered a forgotten mine, which suddenly detonated with tragic results. His mother lost all of her limbs and her voice, falling into a coma before dying. Black Jack himself was all but dead, blasted into 18 different pieces, but he survived with the surgical skills and devotion of Dr. Jōtarō Honma. During this ordeal, Black Jack's friend Takashi (who is half-African) donated some of his skin for a dermal graft, resulting in him having different skin tones for half of his face, which Black Jack later refused to have color-matched out of respect for his friend. Out of worry for his mother, part of his hair turned prematurely white. Unable to handle the situation, his father ran away with a lover.

From that time onward, Black Jack stopped laughing. Wanting revenge, he sought the five people who ruined his mother's life. Among these were Ichigahara and Takuzo Ubamoto.

The explosion caused damage to young Black Jack's lungs, giving him pneumothorax. For a long time afterwards, when meeting a patient with similar pulmonary damage, Black Jack would involuntarily feel sympathetic agony, which developed into an acute phobia. Dr. Yamadano helps cure Black Jack of this fear.

== Romantic interests ==
While still in medical school, Black Jack becomes friends with the dedicated medical intern Maiko Okamoto. They meet when the rest of the school is embroiled in a protest and strike over intern wages, and a three-way accident between a bicycle, bus and train catches the school's hospital understaffed. Although about to pass over the young Black Jack for his strange personality (she finds him sitting on a bench with his eyes closed, muttering and practicing surgery in thin air), she approaches him for help anyway out of desperation. Admiring his skill in action, she remarks to herself, "Patches [Black Jack] isn't half bad!" From there, their relationship deepens as she finds out more about his past and reinforces his emotional development with more compassion and warmth.

Throughout the series, Pinoko (his adopted daughter) has expressed love towards Black Jack which even she herself admits is impossible due to her small body. She often daydreams of going on dates with him and refers to herself as his wife to several people they meet though she does on occasion show attraction to other handsome young men. Black Jack himself denies these claims and often tells her she is his daughter. He even admits to her at one point that he is not suited for love and claimed he only saved her to use her to blackmail her family (this is heavily implied to be a lie). Nonetheless, there are times he does seem to respect her feelings. When he thought she was dying, he built her a human adult body and promised to marry her during her final moments but managed to save her and never gave her the adult body. She also writes multiple love letters to him which he is exasperated by. In addition, when he has a dream about the people that he has met and impacted him, Pinoko appears as an adult and asks to be told he loves her. While he does not state it, he does refer to her as his wife. Overall, it is evident he does love her but his feelings don't seem to go beyond a paternal love mainly because of her body and childish personality.

It is mentioned in Volume 1 chapter 6 that after graduating and becoming an intern, Black Jack fell in love with Megumi Kisaragi. She had ovarian cancer, and after having her ovaries removed, she began living her life as a man, taking on the name Kei.

In Volume 1 chapter 9, there was a female surgeon named Konomi Kuwata (nicknamed Black Queen due to her ability to perform amputations without batting an eye) whom he became interested in because she seemed similar to him. In the manga, he was going to give her a letter but upon seeing her grief over having to amputate her own fiancé's leg, decides to do the surgery himself and leaves before telling her of his feelings. In the anime, his feelings for her are less definite (it is implied he may have developed some feeling for her though not to the extent as in the manga) and the two meet again in Black Jack 21 as good friends and colleagues, with her still as a surgeon.

A teenage cancer patient named Michiru obsessed with marriage announces her desire to marry Black Jack, much to Pinoko's dismay. To lift her spirits and improve her chances of survival, Black Jack agrees to play the part of the groom. After the surgery however, he tells her that it was a fantasy to begin with, and says that he is not fit for love or marriage.

In volume 3 "Black Jack in Hospital" A young inexperienced female doctor who has been in love with Black Jack meets him after he breaks his arm and her brother performs a surgery on him, though at the same time voices his dislike for Black Jack. Despite this the older brother doctor asks Black Jack to marry his sister or never appear before her again. Black Jack agrees and leaves but meets with her one last time to perform the operation on her brother after he is hit by a truck.

In addition, in Volume 10 chapter 9 "Burglary", a woman who was on a honeymoon drive with her husband barely survived a landslide. She had to have her arms amputated by Black Jack who also took care of her rehabilitation. She fell in love with him and her husband, realizing this, had her leave. She later had her prosthetic stolen but refused to retrieve them. Black Jack managed to find them along with discovering letters and photos of himself among the prosthetic, revealing her feelings for him. He returns the prosthetic to her but rejects her feelings and wishes for her happiness.

In Volume 15 Chapter 2 "A Star is Born" a young woman named Igusa Suginami fell in love with Black Jack after he gave her plastic surgery and operated on her face to make her prettier and to make her a bigger star. Black Jack, however, believed she was better with her original face and due to interference by Suginami's manager, she is forced to leave and give up on Black Jack.

In Volume 15 chapter 7, a woman with a type of schizophrenia called Catatonia ran away from home and fell off a cliff. Black Jack tried discussing with the dad how to save her (for 30 million yen). When he finds her, the two end up stuck on the mountain due to heavy rain for ten days. The two get to know each other and it is revealed the father decided not to pay to cure his daughter's surgery and instead abandoned her but Black Jack still went to save her because she reminded him of himself. While dying from her wounds from her fall off the cliff and her illness, she admits she loves him and asks him to marry her. He tries to save her as help arrives, but it is implied she died.

Later, when Black Jack visits the grave of a fellow surgeon on a remote island to pay his respects, he meets his colleague's sister, Dr. Shimizu Ikuo. The sole doctor of the island, she originally came to help her brother, and develops feelings for Black Jack. However, she is killed saving a child from a rockslide; with her dying breath, she asks Black Jack to mimic his facial graft on her skin so that they can be together forever though he chooses not to as he believes she was too beautiful to carve a scar on and her body is buried with her brother's. In the anime, she instead survives though he leaves the island as he sees that the island needs a doctor like her.

== Pinoko ==
The doctor is usually in the company of his ward, Pinoko (also spelled Pinoco). Originally her body development was severely hampered by being her sister's in utero twin, Black Jack was able to surgically extricated her alive. As her organs and internal musculature were salvaged, Black Jack constructed a synthetic body appropriate in size to her organs. While possessing the knowledge of an 18-year-old, she appears a child around 6. Saving her life, yet not wanted by her sister and family, Black Jack adopting her as his daughter. Although she appears to be a fully functional human, Pinoko is incapable of physical growth, and has the personality and appearance of a first grader. Pinoko capably acts as housekeeper, cook and surgical assistant (especially in his home clinic and operating room), but more importantly provides moral support and human warmth to the otherwise emotionally distant doctor.

== Other skills ==
In addition to his medical skills, Black Jack is a skilled fighter. While not violent by nature, he will not hesitate to use force to defend himself or others. Though preferring to fight with his fists, he can use a gun and throw scalpels like darts, having been skilled at darts even as young boy. He carries many extra scalpels in his signature black coat for emergencies, allowing it to double as a bullet-proof vest. As such, he wears his coat even on sunny days.

Black Jack knows how to operate a motorboat and is fluent in Morse Code (Volume 17 Chapter 4: "Captain Park").

== Hobbies and habits ==
Black Jack usually drinks tea or coffee with his rice when he goes to a poor house, and eats curry at restaurants. He is sometimes seen smoking a cigarette or a pipe. He always tries to heal his patients but he will get very emotionally upset if: 1) someone takes his patients; 2) his patients commit suicide; 3) someone kills his patients; or 4) death was inevitable. There were times where people attacked him and was very near death. He even went to jail a few times. Volume 10 Chapter 7: "The Man who Threw up Capsules" was the only time Black Jack is seen with a beard. While his preference in food is never mentioned, he is often shown eating curry or tea over rice (chazuke).

Black Jack enjoys watching oil painting shows. He can also play the piano.

== Clinic and House ==
Black Jack's single-floor cottage was designed and constructed by the somewhat vain carpenter Ushigoro in 1932, using the French colonial or Creole style. In the manga, Pinoko finds a hand print on the house left by Ushigoro, a maker's mark that he leaves on every house he builds in lieu of a signature. If his customer objects to the hand print, he leaves it in the attic. At least 40 years old by the time Black Jack buys the house, fresh from school, it tends to leak during the rainstorms frequenting the coastal area (especially in the OVA, Black Jack 21). It sits on a sheer cliff, with a rear porch topped by a châteauesque conical spire overlooking the sea, while a dirt road leads up the hill to the full-width veranda in the front.

The house has two bedrooms, with one for guests and one Black Jack and his adopted daughter Pinoko, who sleep in separate twin beds. Unusually, the house also features a small operating room, which Black Jack and Ushigoro built together after Black Jack moved in. Although he usually performs surgeries in more-fully-equipped and staffed hospital operating rooms, and even on-site when in more pressing situations, his own operating room sees use in the televised anime, episode 7, when he removes a tumor from a lion cub, and again in episode 22 when treating a boy with mirrored organs and a congenitally enlarged bile duct.

The house later collapses during an earthquake, and is finally destroyed in a typhoon many volumes later.

== Concept and creation ==
Besides being a manga artist, Osamu Tezuka was also a licensed physician. He created many manga titles with medical themes and physician protagonists, and Black Jack may be a personification of himself. Black Jack has been called Tezuka's alter ego, the kind of doctor he wished he could have been. The manga was originally intended as a five-part miniseries but, thanks to the audience reception, Tezuka's engagement with the character was extended to five years.

Black Jack's attitude and matter of dress are meant to remind readers of the archetypal pirate: rebellious and clever, a man who operates outside the bureaucracy of modern life. His scar embodies the principle of the hero: his half-black, half-white face foregoes any claim to "purity"—be it cultural or ideological—and betrays the complexity of the character.

In the end, Black Jack is capable of great kindness as well as brutal cruelty.

== Other appearances ==
As part of "Osamu Tezuka's Star System", Black Jack has appeared in several of the artist's works.

Black Jack starred as a side character in episode 27, "The Time Machine," of the 1980 animated adaptation of Tezuka's Astro Boy. Both he and Astro were recruited by a detective from the distant future, and taken back to a medieval castle to catch a man attempting to alter the timeline, where Black Jack was to heal a sick prince (actually Tezuka character Princess Knight) while Astro was to protect the castle from an evil sorcerer. While Astro attempts to fight the beasts sent by the sorcerer, Black Jack discovers that the prince is actually a princess, and, using clever deception, manages to heal her as Astro defeats the sorcerer. In true Black Jack fashion, he tells the town to learn to accept that they have a female ruler, and refuses payment, instead taking a commemorative coin before returning to the future, which Astro values the mint condition artifact to today be worth several million dollars.

Black Jack makes cameo appearances in 1979's Marine Express, in 1980's Phoenix 2772 as the foreman of the prison planet labor camp, and in the 2004 video games Astro Boy and Astro Boy: Omega Factor. He also appears in one panel in Tezuka's work Buddha as a hallucination as well as a cameo under a different name and somewhat different appearance in "Phoenix" in the volume titled "Nostalgia", where he apparently holds some degree of power over a group of thugs about to take advantage of the main character Romy.

Black Jack is also ambiguously referenced in the manga Pluto, a remake of Astro Boy created by Naoki Urasawa with approval from Osamu Tezuka before his death.

In 2010, a short was released showing Black Jack teaming up with Dr. House to promote the DVD release of the show's fourth season. In it, Black Jack was hired to replace Kutner. House immediately takes a dislike to him, and vice versa, but Black Jack quits on amicable terms with House after they cooperate on a difficult surgery.

Black Jack appears alongside fellow Tezuka character Astro Boy as a playable character in the 2019 crossover puzzle game Crystal Crisis.

== Cultural impact and legacy ==
Black Jack is one of Tezuka's most beloved characters and his popularity is rivaled only by Astro Boy.

Other manga artists have paid homage to Tezuka's surgeon. Shūhō Satō's Say Hello to Black Jack is named after Tezuka's character. A surgeon, identified only as B.J., appears in Akihito Yoshitomi's Ray. In the story, B.J. operates on the title character, giving her X-ray vision. The character of former police coroner and serial killer Shingo Zuhaku, whose design is based on Tezuka's Black Jack, appears in horror manga The Kurosagi Corpse Delivery Service by Eiji Ōtsuka and Housui Yamazaki.

Kamen Rider Den-O's Imagin Anime OVA parodized Black Jack by having Ryutaros cosplay as him in a doctor sketch. The character from Kamen Rider Ex-Aid, Taiga Hanaya/Kamen Rider Snipe is based on Black Jack himself, so as his female gaming genius sidekick Nico Saiba shares a similar role as Pinoko.

During the 2007 batsu game for Downtown no Gaki no Tsukai ya Arahende!!, which took place at a hospital, comedian Itsuji Itao repeatedly appeared during the game dressed up as Black Jack, with requisite black cape, hair and scar. Pinoko also appears by his side. He'd leave the scene after being spotted, with an announcer saying "Itsuji Itao presents: Black Jack!"

IGN ranked him as the 24th greatest anime character of all time, saying he "did what few characters in anime have achieved: he made an everyday profession into something heroic."
