= Black Jack (manga) =

Japanese manga series

- First tankōbon volume cover, featuring Kuroo Hazama (Black Jack)

ブラック・ジャック (Burakku Jakku)
- Genre: Medical suspense
- Manga
- Written by: Osamu Tezuka
- Published by: Akita Shoten
- English publisher: NA: Vertical Inc.
- Imprint: Shōnen Champion Comics
- Magazine: Weekly Shōnen Champion
- Original run: 19 November 1973 – 14 October 1983
- Volumes: 25
Further information
Live-action film
The Visitor in the Eye
Directed by	Nobuhiko Obayashi
Produced by	Takeo Hori; Hideo Sasai
Written by	Jêmusu Miki
Music by	Naoshi Miyazaki
Studio	Toho; Hori Productions
Released	26 November 1977
Runtime	140 minutes
Original video animation
Directed by	Osamu Dezaki; Satoshi Kuwabara (#11); Masayoshi Nishida (#12)
Produced by	Sumio Udagawa; Minoru Kubota (#1–10); Tomoyuki Saitō (#11–12)
Written by	Kuniaki Yamashita (#1); Eto Mori (#2); Katsuhiko Koide (#3–6); Kei Hiyoshi (#7, 9); Tomoko Konparu (#8); Mayumi Morita (#11); Masayoshi Nishida (#12)
Music by	Osamu Shōji (#1–5); Eiji Kawamura (#6–10); Seiji Suzuki (#11–12)
Studio	Tezuka Productions
Licensed by	NA: AnimEigo
Released	21 December 1993 – 16 December 2011
Runtime	47–53 minutes
Episodes	12
Anime film
Black Jack: The Movie
Directed by	Osamu Dezaki
Produced by	Kazuyoshi Okuyama; Minoru Kotoku; Takayuki Matsutani; Yasuo Ishida; Yoshihiro Shimizu
Written by	Eto Mori
Music by	Eiji Kawamura
Studio	Tezuka Productions
Licensed by	NA: Discotek Media; SEA: Muse Communication
Released	30 November 1996
Runtime	105 minutes
Original video animation
Black Jack: The Boy Who Came from the Sky
Directed by	Shinji Seya
Produced by	Minoru Kubota; Mitsuashi Ōishi
Studio	Tezuka Productions
Released	22 March 2000
Runtime	22 minutes
Anime television series
Directed by	Makoto Tezuka; Satoshi Kuwabara
Produced by	Tomoyuki Saitō; Sumio Udagawa
Written by	Genki Yoshimura
Music by	Akihiko Matsumoto
Studio	Tezuka Productions
Original network	NNS (YTV)
Original run	11 October 2004 – 6 March 2006
Episodes	61
Manga
Black Jack: the Dark Surgeon
Written by	Kenji Yamamoto
Published by	Akita Shoten
Magazine	Weekly Shōnen Champion
Original run	9 May 2005 – 9 February 2006
Volumes	3
Anime film
Black Jack: The Two Doctors of Darkness
Directed by	Makoto Tezuka
Written by	Katsuhiko Chiba
Music by	Isao Tomita
Studio	Tezuka Productions
Released	17 December 2005
Runtime	97 minutes
Anime television series
Black Jack 21
Directed by	Makoto Tezuka; Satoshi Kuwabara
Produced by	Tomoyuki Saitō; Sumio Udagawa
Written by	Katsuyuki Sumisawa
Music by	Akihiko Matsumoto
Studio	Tezuka Productions
Original network	Yomiuri TV
Original run	10 April 2006 – 4 September 2006
Episodes	17
Related
Ray; Young Black Jack
- icon

Black Jack (Japanese: ブラック・ジャック, Hepburn: Burakku Jakku), often abbreviated as B・J, is a Japanese manga series written and illustrated by Osamu Tezuka. Following the medical adventures of the title character, Black Jack consists of hundreds of short, self-contained stories that are typically about 20 pages long. Black Jack has also been animated into an OVA, two television series (directed by Satoshi Kuwahara and Tezuka's son Makoto Tezuka) and two films.

In 1977, it won the first Kodansha Manga Award for the shōnen category. It has since then become one of Tezuka's best selling manga with over 47.66 million copies sold in Japan. Osamu Dezaki's anime film adaptation, Black Jack: The Movie, won Best Animation Film at the 1996 Mainichi Film Awards.

== Plot ==
Most of the stories involve Black Jack doing some good deed, for which he rarely gets recognition—often curing the poor and destitute for free, or teaching the arrogant a lesson in humility. They sometimes end with a good, humane person enduring hardship, often unavoidable death, to save others.

== Characters ==
=== Main characters ===
Black Jack aka Kurō Hazama

- First Appearance: Volume 1 Chapter 1: "Is there a Doctor?"

Pinoko (ピノコ)

- Voiced by: Yūko Mizutani
- First Appearance: Volume 1 Chapter 3: "Teratogenous Cystoma"

Pinoko is Black Jack's loyal assistant/adopted daughter, who was actually a Teratogenous Cystoma (a growth more commonly known as a teratoma). She was a rare type of parasitic twin, living as part of a patients' body for eighteen years. When the presence of the twin was evidenced from a grotesque distortion in the host's body, Black Jack was contracted to extract and dispose of the growth. In the end, he found the cystoma, although a collection of uncontained organs and muscles, was complete in design if not form. Using life support to maintain them, Black Jack encased the assembly in an artificially constructed exoskeleton sized and shaped in the form of a female human child (around 7 or 8 years). Miraculously, the homunculus survived with all sensory reception intact. Developing into a sentient though permanently child-sized life form, she was adopted by Black Jack as his informal ward. Pinoko always helps the doctor by doing household chores and by being his assistant in some of his operations. She often acts as comic relief in Black Jack, claiming to be a girl of eighteen years of age and married to Black Jack, despite her childlike appearance and personality. Her main value is companionship and source of affection for the ordinarily cold-natured doctor. When she started living with Black Jack, she could not cook, clean, or take care of the house; she could not even walk, let alone move. Eventually, she learned through hard effort. Being still a child, she occasionally makes accidental errors, such as using salt instead of sugar while preparing meals. Black Jack thinks of her as his daughter while she thinks of herself as his wife. Black Jack modeled her face after a cute girl he had seen in a medical journal who has a lung ailment of unknown origin (from Volume 7 Chapter 4: "The Two Pinokos"). Pinoko's life has been put in danger a few times; she was kidnapped (Volume 2 Chapter 8: "Kidnapping", Volume 14 Chapter 2: "The Third Call", Volume 15 Chapter 1: "Treasure Island"), swallowed a potassium cyanide pill (Volume 4 Chapter 12: "Gas"), hit by a bullet (Volume 7 Chapter 10: "Black and White"), crashed a car (Volume 8 Chapter 8: "A Visit from a Killer"), and caught an aggressive form of leukemia (Volume 9 Chapter 2: "Pinoko Lives"). Pinoko says she is 18 years old because that is how long she was in her sister's body, but Black Jack says she is 0-years-old when he built her. Because of that, she sometimes acts like an adult while other times as a 7-year-old. She cries when she is injured or throws things when she is mad. She is sometimes seen drawing pictures, playing games, or reading children's stories. Throughout the whole manga series, she is never seen going to school, but has school-aged friends such as Hosuke Sharaku. She aspires to go to school like others her size, and thought about taking the high school entrance exam. Black Jack never tries to give Pinoko an 18-year-old body even though she wants to be bigger. She almost received one when she nearly died in Volume 9 Chapter 2: "Pinoko Lives". She sometimes talks in third-person, using "Pinoko" instead of "I", "me", or "my". Before Black Jack extracted her from her twin, she temporarily had the ability to telepathically communicate; this characteristic saved her life in that Black Jack recognized her body was alive. As well, in Volume 13 Chapter 4: "Teratoid Cystoma, Part 2", she was able to talk to a teratoid cystoma in a patient in her sleep. Pinoko's main form of comic relief is yelling アッチョンブリケ(Acchonburike)—a phrase that has no real meaning but taken as a rough equivalent to "Oh my goodness!" (often spelled "Omigewdness" in fansubs) or "I don't believe it!" (as translated when she appeared in an episode of the Astro Boy 80s series), in English—while pressing her cheeks together with her hands when something surprising happens. In the 2004 English dub of the anime, she shouts "Allamoby!" Also, she says Aramanchu!, which has no real meaning, but can be roughly translated as "okey dokey!" Her name is derived from Pinocchio and the game pinochle.

=== Supporting characters ===
Lady Yurie (ユリエ様, Yurie-sama)

- First Appearance: Volume 1 Chapter 3: "Teratoid Cystoma"

The twin sister of Pinoko, whose name is only revealed in the OVA. She does not like the fact that her teratoid cystoma is actually her twin sister. She would always look away and say that that thing is not her sister. Her face and background is never revealed until Volume 17 Chapter 10: "A Visiting Memory". Her second appearance is in Volume 9 Chapter 2: "Pinoko Lives" where she donates some of her blood to Pinoko. She expresses hope that this would be the last time she would have to be involved with her, as she is engaged to be married. Her third appearance is in Volume 17 Chapter 10: "A Visiting Memory" where her face and background are finally revealed. Dr. Crab tells Black Jack that she is actually the daughter of an important Buddhist line. She was constrained by pedigree and form. The family is always churning in drama, and she ended up deeply depressed. Then she tries to commit suicide by jumping from the third floor of her house. She survived and, with a huge amount of cash and amnesia, ended up at Black Jack's house. Pinoko and her had a sisterly bond despite neither knowing the identity of the other. When she saw Dr. Crab, her memories returned and she quickly departed, having remembered the nature of her relationship to Pinoko. Pinoko did not know who she really was; Black Jack did.

Dr. Jotaro Honma (本間 丈太郎, Honma Jōtarō)

- Voiced by: Osamu Saka
- First Appearance: Volume 1 Chapter 5: "Sometimes like Pearls"

The reason why Black Jack pursued a career in medicine is because of Dr. Honma, his mentor and life-saver, who acted as the young boy's father-figure. Kagemitsu Hazama, Black Jack's real father, left his wife and son to live in Macau with his new wife Renka. As a child, Black Jack suffered from paralysis in all four limbs and spent many lonely years in a wheelchair until he regained the use of them. Dr. Honma wrote a book about this miracle, as depicted in Volume 1 Chapter 11: "The Legs of an Ant". The medical community accused him of conducting a live experiment on a patient with a rare "Honma's Hematoma" and killed the patient. He was then forced to retire. When he died, Black Jack went through Dr. Honma's old files and found a letter addressed to him. Dr. Honma wanted Black Jack to find out the mystery of "Honma's Hematoma", but until he solve the mystery, to not operate on any patients who have it. Lumps of blood in the heart will form, even after many surgeries to get rid of them, they will come back. Because of that, many patients die of weak hearts. In Volume 13 Chapter 9: "Honma's Hematoma", Black Jack found the cure. The patient's heart will be replaced with an artificial heart. But it turns out that "Honma's Hematoma" is a disease caused by patients who already have artificial hearts. Dr. Honma dies of old age in the episode four of Black Jack 4 Miracles of Life "Just like a Pearl" after a failed surgical attempt to revive him. However, he plays an important role in Black Jack 21, since he had once worked at the "Noir Project". In the manga, he dies in Volume 1 Chapter 5: "Sometimes like Pearls."

Megumi Kisaragi (如月めぐみ, Kisaragi Megumi)

- First Appearance: Volume 1 Chapter 6: "Confluence"

Megumi Kisaragi is Black Jack's tragic love, whom he met and courted during their internship. Her first appearance was in Volume 1 Chapter 6: "Confluence" in the manga. She stayed up late at work and cared more about the patients than everyone else. She discovered that Kuroo Hazama had been the one looking after her whenever she walked alone at night. Later, she is revealed to have ovarian cancer, and is afraid to tell Black Jack because of her fear that having these parts removed will interfere with their relationship. Nevertheless, the couple confesses their love before the operation while Megumi is "still a woman" (in reality, a hysterectomy or oophorectomy can affect sexual function, but the side effects associated with these procedures are not as extreme as those depicted in this story).

- Afterwards, Megumi changed her name to Kei, a male name, and started living his life as a man, treating sick patients as a ship's doctor.
- He is seen again in Volume 11 Chapter 14: "The SL Called Life" on the same train as Black Jack.

Konomi Kuwata aka Black Queen (桑田このみ, Kuwata Konomi)

- First Appearance: Volume 1 Chapter 9: "Black Queen"
- First making her appearance in Volume 1 Chapter 9: "Black Queen", Kuwata Konomi was a doctor specializing in amputations, thought to be heartless by many, earning her the nickname 'Black Queen' in the medical world. She is engaged to Rock (referred to as Makube Rokuro in the TV series, probably to make up for the lack of "Carved Seal" episode), but her being infamous causes troubles for the couple. She met Black Jack, drunk, in a bar, naming herself as the Black Queen. The former is impressed by their similarities and falls in love with her, but he would eventually discover that Rock was her fiancé.
- She is seen again two years after her first appearance, now in Volume 5 Chapter 5: "The Last Train". Her name is now Konomi Suzuki, after she married Rock. Half a year after Rock's surgery, they got married. She got fired and left for a plane to meet her husband.

Takashi

- Voiced by: Kazuki Yao
- First Appearance: Volume 2 Chapter 7: "Where Art Thou, Friend?"
- Takashi grafted some of his skin to Black Jack when they were younger because Black Jack would always lend him his notes and help him with his homework. He donated 20 cm x 20 cm skin from his right buttock. Because he was half-African and half-Japanese, the skin that was surgically sewn onto Black Jack's face is tan. By the time Black Jack could remove the bandages from his body, Takashi had moved away. Years passed and Black Jack started searching for Takashi. Takashi gave an unknown man a letter to deliver to Black Jack in Algiers. The letter explains that Takashi wanted to become a doctor, but was killed in Algiers. He was a member of an environmentalist group which strongly opposed plans to build nuclear power plants in Africa. Now the skin on Black Jack's left side of his face became a memento. Black Jack considers him a friend.

Maestro Morozoff

- Voiced by Kaneta Kimotsuki
- First Appearance: Volume 2 Chapter 11: "Stradivarius"
- Maestro Morozoff is a world-famous violinist who sat beside Black Jack on a plane ride from Tokyo, using a route through the North Pole. The passengers on board stayed in an Eskimo village until the blizzard died down and a rescue team could come. He considers his violin to be his son. When he went out to search for his violin, he caught a severe case of frostbite. Because Black Jack left his medical equipments in the plane and the blizzard snowed in the door, Black Jack could not do anything. Realizing he could not play anymore when he saw his dead fingers on a tray, Morozoff decided to retire. When the blizzard came to an end, they buried his fingers near the village. When they left, the couple that let the passengers stay, found the violin. They decided to bury it with Morozoff's fingers.

Biwamaru (琵琶丸)

- Voiced by: Nachi Nozawa
- First Appearance: Volume 2 Chapter 14: "The Blind Acupuncturist"
- Biwamaru is a wandering doctor who specializes in acupuncture. He made his first appearance in Volume 2 Chapter 14: "The Blind Acupuncturist" in the manga and episode 51 in the anime. He is blind, but he can walk on his own, and goes wandering everywhere where his sensitive nose takes him, since he is able to smell out the whereabouts of people who are sick. He cures his patients without accepting any money in return, making him homeless. Biwamaru carries a walking stick and a huge purse-like bag with his medical equipment. He dislikes operations, saying that humans are not supposed to be operated on too many times and should depend on the healing power of their own bodies.
- Biwamaru believes that his needle techniques are the solution to any medical problem. He often cures Black Jack's patients, causing Black Jack to feel unhappy and annoyed. One day he treated a patient of Black Jack's, a child, but he made a terrible mistake. He had thought that his needle techniques were perfect, but unbeknownst to him, the small child had a fear of needles, worsening her condition. Black Jack was furious and intended to show the proud Biwamaru his mistake. Later, Biwamaru cured Black Jack's large intestine, which Black Jack has attempted to treat through surgery, by piercing a needle into his foot in return for Black Jack's kindness in helping him fix his error with the patient.
- He is seen again in Volume 5 Chapter 7: "Two at the Baths" in the Pitbottom Hot Springs. When he accompanied Black Jack to a skilled swordsmith by the name of Hyo Jisai, the swordsmith knew that he needled 10,000 people, 200 of which are injured.

Dr. Kiriko (ドクター・キリコ, Dokutā Kiriko)

- First Appearance: Volume 3 Chapter 9: "Two Dark Doctors"
- Dr. Kiriko, the "death doctor" ("Reaper's Avatar" in the manga), is another shadowy doctor, traveling the world like Black Jack. He wears an eye patch covering his left eye. When Kiriko was a military doctor, he saw many patients in great pain, and came to practice euthanasia. He often appears in the manga, attempting to put down terminally ill patients whom Black Jack wants to save. He is so dedicated to euthanasia that he once attempted to commit suicide when he contracted a rare, infectious disease. Though arch-rivals, Kiriko and Black Jack have been in situations where they had to cooperate in order to survive or to accomplish a task, and manage to do so with good results. Whenever he is confronted by Black Jack after a successful operation which avoided the death alternative, Kiriko simply replies with something along the lines of "I'm a doctor as well, you know." He only gives people death if they ask for it or the chances of survival is 0%, no suicide.
- He is seen a second time in Volume 5 Chapter 6: "There was a Valve!", when he tries to kill yet another patient, which is his father who has pneumothorax for five years. Dr. Kiriko could not find the hole until Black Jack pumped oxygen into his trachea but it was hopeless. Dr. Kiriko injected poison into his system. He died in the operating room.
- He is seen yet again in Volume 5 Chapter 10: "99% Water" on an uninhabited island; he has gumma. Yuri brought Black Jack to the island to find out how to cure him. Black Jack found out that gumma was caused by an amoeba, similar to a jellyfish, which consists of 99.9% water. You have to freeze it to see it.
- He made another appearance in Volume 6 Chapter 14: "Terror Virus" in the manga.
- He is seen a fifth time in Volume 8 Chapter 10:"One Hour to Death" when he bought a new drug called cardiotoxin. Anyone who drinks it will fall asleep, then their heartbeat will slow down and, in one hour, die.
- He is seen for the sixth time in Volume 11 Chapter 14: "The SL Called Life" on the same train as Black Jack.
- 7th time in Volume 13 Chapter 6: "A Fussy Suicide"
- 8th time in Volume 14 Chapter 6: "Urashima"
- In the Clinical Chart OVA series, Dr. Kiriko is introduced only as Mozart, in homage to his affinity for classical music. In this OVA, it is also shown that Kiriko does not charge immense amounts of money like Black Jack, nor did he consider his style of treatment as a 'solution to all sicknesses,' as demonstrated by his act of charity when he provided basic nutrients and some food to a patient suffering from what appeared to be severe anorexia at one point.
- In the same series of OVA, it is shown that he travels by motorcycle and has proficiency in mechanics and music.

Tetsu (in the manga) aka Master (哲（てつ）, Tetsu)

- Voiced by: Kōsei Tomita
- First Appearance: Volume 4 Chapter 7: "Tetsu of the Yamanote Line"
- Tetsu is a pickpocket. He could pickpocket anyone on the Yamanote Line and they would not know it. He can tell how much money people are holding from the nervous look in their eyes. The inspector in charge of him kept an eye on him, to catch him in action, and arrest him. When Tetsu followed a man, who he thinks have a lot of money, through the line, he ended up being surround by his gang. They took him to a back alley and cut off four of his fingers. The inspector, who was following him, found him in the alley. He took him to the hospital and had Black Jack operate on Tetsu. The inspector wanted Tetsu's fingers to be restored to before the accident, to how nimble they were. His fingers were fully restored when he showed the inspector his stole badge, pen, and wallet. Then they went out to drink.
- His second appearance is in Volume 11 Chapter 14: "The SL Called Life" when he is the conductor of an SL train.
- In the anime, he has a steady role as the owner of Tom's, a coffee shop that Black Jack frequents. Owing his gratitude to Jotaro Honma, he fosters Kumiko and treats her as his daughter. In the past, he was a nameless magician who took up pickpocketing.
- Tetsu is "played" by Shunsaku Ban, a member of Tezuka's "star system" who appears in several manga stories by Tezuka.

Largo (ラルゴ, Rarugo)

- Voiced by: Makoto Ishii
- First Appearance: Volume 4 Chapter 14: "Thieving Dog"
- Largo was a stray dog found by Pinoko, Wato, and Sharaku during a car accident. In the anime she is saved after an earthquake caused Black Jack's house to collapse on top of her, and she becomes his pet dog. She is named Largo for her lethargic nature, but she compensates with her sharp senses in detecting danger.
- In the manga, she stole an umbrella from a stranger, causing her to get run over by a truck. Black Jack and Pinoko found her lying on the road. Black Jack refused to treat her but with Pinoko's screams, he treated her. Now she lives in a box, decorated by Pinoko, on the porch. She is an extremely lazy dog who uses a straw to drink water and takes two days to fetch the newspaper. It was her instinct as a dog, when she stole a necklace given to Black Jack by the president of Republic of Cainan, to force Black Jack to chase her with the necklace out of the house. Black Jack caught her and made her return it to his house. When she went into the house, a high magnitude earthquake shook his house. She is an extremely smart dog who stole something from someone to prevent them from dying from a fallen debris. She dies from a ceiling beam falling on top of her.

Yuri

- First Appearance: Volume 5 Chapter 6: "There was a Valve!"
- Yuri is Dr. Kiriko's sister. She is a kind girl who tries to prevent her brother from killing people. When secretly went to Black Jack to have him heal her father. In the end, Dr. Kiriko poisoned him.
- She is seen again in Volume 5 Chapter 10: "99% Water" in Black Jack's house, to escort him to Dr. Kiriko to an uninhabited island because he has gumma.

Mio Hazama (間みお)

- Voiced by: Mako Hyoudou
- First Appearance: Volume 7 Chapter 5: "Unexploded Bomb"
- Mio Hazama was Black Jack's mother. She died after the incident which was explained in Volume 7 Chapter 5: "Unexploded Bomb". Her husband left her for another woman. Black Jack was filled with murderous attempts while she wept. Before she died, she told Black Jack to forgive his father, because she already knew the reason why his husband left them, which was mentioned in Volume 10 Chapter 2: "The Mask Chosen".

Kagemitsu Hazama

- First Appearance: Volume 10 Chapter 2: "The Mask Chosen"
- Kagemitsu Hazama is Black Jack's father. He left his wife and son after the incident which was explained in Volume 7 Chapter 5: "Unexploded Bomb" and was not heard from for 20 years. Later he flew to Macau, China with his new wife. But the reasons for Kagemitsu's behaviour is later explained in the Black Jack 21 series. In the manga, Volume 10 Chapter 2: "The Mask Chosen", he asks Black Jack to go to Aoyama to cure his second wife of Hansen's disease. Kagemitsu immediately reveals that he had an ulterior motive for summoning his son: because Hansen's disease had made Reika sterile, Kagemitsu wished to have Kurō live with them and become the heir to his fortune. When Black Jack asked him if he still loved Mio, he said no and only loves Reika.
- His second appearance was in Volume 10 Chapter 8: "Flesh and Blood". He had a stroke and ended up in a coma for three days. He later dies and his son takes his body back to Japan to be buried with Mio as a final revenge against his father.

Reika Hazama

- First Appearance: Volume 10 Chapter 2: "The Mask Chosen"
- Reika Hazama is Kagemitsu Hazama's second wife and Black Jack's stepmother. She met Kagemitsu in Macao when he came for work. They started living together and he never went back to Japan. In Volume 10 Chapter 2: "The Mask Chosen", she had Hansen's disease and Black Jack surgically repaired her face. Out of revenge for Kagamitsu for not loving Mio, Black Jack gave her the face of his ex-wife, Mio.
- Her second appearance was in Volume 10 Chapter 8: "Flesh and Blood". She called Black Jack to help Kagemitsu wake up from a coma but, instead, he dies. The reader later finds out that she sent Black Jack to come to Macao to then later kidnap him. She wanted Shoren to inherit Kagemitsu's legacy but Black Jack was in the way. Shoren was disgusted to learn that Reika would do something so deplorable, especially when she prevented Black Jack seeing his father's death. In the end, Shoren disowns Reika and is killed by the same assassins Reika had hired and her stepson has severed all ties with her, leaving her alone in the world.

Ushigoro

- Voiced by: Takeshi Aono
- First Appearance: Volume 10 Chapter 4: "Unfinished House"
- Ushigoro was the carpenter who built Black Jack's house before he was the owner. Before Black Jack moved in, the previous owner asked Ushigoro to build the house. He always leaves his trademark hand print on the places he built; if the owner does not like it, he leaves it in the attic. He told Black Jack, who was right out of med school, that he built the house in '32. From a blood sample, Black Jack was able to diagnose that Ushigoro has late-stage leukemia. Black Jack helped him build an operation room and a patient room. Even with leukemia, he pushes himself to finish building the house. The reason how he has leukemia was from the radiation at Hiroshima. He never noticed it for 30 years until a few years ago. Ushigoro became Black Jack's first patient at the new clinic. But since Black Jack was fresh out of med school, the leukemia was too much for him. He told Ushigoro to go to a large hospital; and each made a promise – Ushigoro will come back and finish the construction while Black Jack will become the world's best doctor. Even with Pinoko around, Black Jack's promise to Ushigoro is still kept.

Shoren (in the manga) aka Benitokage (紅蜥蜴, Benitokage)

- Voiced by: Yumi Touma
- First Appearance: Volume 10 Chapter 8: "Flesh and Blood"
- In the manga, her name is Shoren. She is Black Jack's half-sister. The daughter of Kagemitsu Hazama and Reika. In the manga version, when she finds out what her mother did to Black Jack in Volume 10 Chapter 8: "Flesh and Blood", she spat on her and told her servants to deliver her father's corpse to Black Jack. At first she despises Black Jack since she thought he only came for the inheritance but after finding out the truth, she secretly forgave him. She later dies saving Black Jack from a pair of assassins her mother hired, but not before she and her half-brother wordlessly reconcile.
- In the anime, Black Jack has two sisters. The first one is named Shoren and she plays a similar role to her manga counterpart, where she shuns Black Jack and believes he is after their money and sends him his father's corpse in exchange he leave their family alone. Unlike her manga counterpart, she is not sympathetic to him. The other sister is named Benitokage. She is raised by her grandfather, Zen Mantoku as an assassin to silence him and Pinoco everywhere he went for the sake of finding out the truth of the incident that happened during the bombing disaster on the mine field. She becomes increasingly obsessed with killing him since he always manages to escape and even disobeys orders to leave him alone as she claims it is her way of life to end her target. However, while obsessed with killing him, she ends up learning that she is his half brother taken from her parents by her grandfather due to his dislike for his son in law and she sacrifices herself to save him. she is similar to the manga counterpart in that she sacrifices herself to save Black Jack at the cost of her own life and the two reconcile at her death.

Guffaw

- First Appearance: Volume 12 Chapter 13: "Prone to Laughter"
- Guffaw is a boy who went to the same school as Black Jack. In the school, he is always seen laughing and everyone knows it. Everyone who heard it, laugh themselves, except Black Jack. He did not like how Guffaw would laugh even when his parents left one night and committed suicide in a car. There was something about him that brought them together. One day when Black Jack visits him, Guffaw told him that he wanted to be a manga artist, so anyone who reads it will laugh. Later that night, the debt collectors came for his parents. Thinking that his parents secretly came home and leave, they attacked Guffaw. Black Jack threw one of his darts at one of the collectors. That person used it to stab Guffaw in the throat. He ended up getting cyanosis and eventually transferred far away. Laughter in the school faded away. Later, Black Jack studied medicine at a university and, after 8 years since the accident, he went to search for Guffaw. When Black Jack found him in the sanatorium, he still has the recurring effect of cyanosis. Wanting Guffaw to laugh again, Black Jack operated on him. The surgery was a success until a secondary infection occurred. Knowing his end was nearing, Guffaw laughed until he could laugh no more. Then he died.

Kumi Yamashita (in the manga) aka Kumiko Honma (本間久美子, Honma Kumiko)

- Voiced by: Akiko Kawase
- First Appearance: Volume 14 Chapter 4: "Full-Moon Disease"
- In the manga, her name is Kumi Yamashita. She is Dr. Jotaro Honma's 18-year-old daughter. She used to work at a coffee shop until she came down with Cushing's Syndrome or known as Full-Moon Disease. Her ex-fiancée, Shoichi Marugiri, dumped her because of it. Black Jack was able to find her and surgically repair her. Her ex-fiancée came back wanting to marry again but Black Jack got rid of him. Other than her, Black Jack is the only one who visits Dr. Honma's grave.
- In the anime, her name is Kumiko Honma. She is a character original to the TV series, she is an immigrant from China who transferred to Oana Senior High School. The daughter of Dr. Honma, whose life was saved by a teen Black Jack when she was a little girl. She works in Black Jack's favorite café and keeps an Inter Generational Friendship with him. Contrary to her best friend Wato, Kumiko has an introverted and attentive personality. For trying to save her father, healing Tetsu's fingers, and restoring her eyesight, she supports Black Jack. In the 2004 series she has glaucoma, so she has to get a cornea transplant to save her eyesight.

Dr. Yamadano

- First Appearance: Volume 1 Chapter 12: "Two Loves"
- Dr. Yamadano is a good friend of Black Jack. He sometimes calls Black Jack to help him on difficult surgeries. He is usually seen wearing a monocle on his left eye, sometimes right.
- He is seen for the second time in Volume 2 Chapter 14: "The Blind Acupuncturist"
- 3rd time in Volume 5 Chapter 11: "The Helper"
- 4th time in Volume 9 Chapter 11: "Gift to the Future"
- 5th time in Volume 11 Chapter 1: "Spasm"
- 6th time in Volume 14 Chapter 4: "Full-Moon Disease"
- 7th time in Volume 14 Chapter 13: "Black Jack Disease"
- 8th time in Volume 15 Chapter 10: "A Surgeon Lives for Music".
- 9th time in Volume 16 Chapter 2: "Miyuki and Ben"
- 10th time in Volume 17 Chapter 7: "Money! Money! Money!"

Osamu Tezuka (手塚 治虫, Tezuka Osamu)

- Osamu Tezuka is a character that is the self caricature of the main author of Black Jack. Tezuka often inserted himself into his works and is distinguishable by his small round nose and round trimmed glasses and short brown hair. In the manga he sometimes appears in cameos as himself or in humorous situations or to break the fourth wall. In the anime, he appears as a doctor and friend of Black Jack, often referring patients with difficult to operate diseases to Black Jack and Black Jack tends to respect and listen to his opinion.

Inspector Tomobiki

- Voiced by: Kenji Utsumi
- Inspector Tomobiki is an inspector with a minor role in the manga and a slightly more recurring role in the anime. He is an inspector and appears in a couple of other Osamu Tezuka's works known under the name Acetylene Lamp. He is characteristic for having a candle appear on the back of his head when he has an idea. He mainly sets out to arrest Black Jack for not having a license, but tends to fail each time. In the manga, he forces Black Jack to operate on Tetsu, a pickpocket after his fingers are cut off so that way the inspector can finally catch the pickpocket in the act of stealing and arrest him. Later, he tries to arrest Black Jack because Black Jack failed to cure his son of a disease but instead is commissioned to watch over Black Jack and makes sure he takes a test to see if he is qualified to have a license. He is tasked to operate on a boy with a skin disorder and succeeds, and it turns out the child is the inspector's son. However, Black Jack is still unable to receive his license and the inspector walks away in shame when seeing Black Jack as he had previously accused him of not being able to heal his son. The anime mainly has him keeping the same role though in Black Jack 21 he helps temporarily hide Black Jack by using his authority to proclaim Black Jack is dead. He appears briefly in the Black Jack: Two Doctors of Darkness Movie trying to find the kidnapped Black Jack. He also appears infrequently in the OVAs (mainly OVAs 4 and 9) having moved to Juvenile department and having a more friendly relationship with Black Jack.

Chiyoko Wato (和登千代子, Wato Chiyoko)

- Voiced by: Ryōko Ono
- Chiyoko Wato is a character not seen in the manga. A character adapted from The Three-Eyed One, Wato is the captain of kendo club in Ooana Senior High School, and is notorious for her tardiness. With a strong sense of justice, she is an outspoken tomboy, a contrast to her best friend Kumiko. Unlike in The Three-Eyed One, where she is a friend and love interest to Sharaku, in the animated version of Black Jack, Wato and Sharaku are siblings. After Black Jack heals Sharaku's illness in "The Missing Needle", Wato becomes a positive supporter and friend of the doctor. Her father, Dr. Kenmochi, is an archaeologist who works around South Asia.

Hosuke Sharaku (写楽保介, Sharaku Hōsuke)

- Voiced by: Yūko Satō
- Hosuke Sharaku is a character not seen in the manga. Sharaku is a schoolboy attending Shiokou Junior High School. He is a gentle boy who takes interest in the supernatural, as seen in "Invaders from Space". Since "The Missing Needle", wherein Black Jack healed him, he has been Pinoko's best friend and her partner-in-crime when it comes to comic relief. He is known to have a limitless memory of random information, yet does terribly in school.
- Sharaku is a member of Tezuka's "star system" and appears in several manga stories by Tezuka. His primary manga is The Three-Eyed One, where he is the main character, alongside Wato Chiyoko.

Zen Mantoku

- Voiced by: Seiji Matsuyama

Zen Mantoku is a character not seen in the manga. The true main antagonist in the Black Jack 21 series as he is the one who caused the beach explosion that injured Black Jack and his mother. He is also the one who framed Jotaro Honma by using the medical community to accuse him of human experimentation and forced him to retire. Afterwards, he used his partners as test subjects by improving their blood vessel by using the phoenix diseases in hopes of living for eternity. However, it all failed and they died one by one following by the story. He is the one, who separated the Renka older daughter for the sake to train her to become one of the most deadly assassin. Eventually, he is caused by the phoenix diseases throughout the world for the benefit of his organization around the globe. In the end, his final fate ended up by Renka shot him in his head and died.

Dr. White

- Dr. White is a character not seen in the manga. Most technology doctors hired by the Japanese World Medicinal Organization with his evolution Machine to cure all the illness.

Patrick

- A character from Black Jack OVA: Miracle in San Mérida.
- A millionaire young man on a mission to find his true identity, due only being adopted by a rich American couple, who later died. He has frequent blood ruptures on his skin. He also wanted to know someone who knew what and why he always dream a mother-and-daughter, who always mutter San Mérida on his dreams. He later knew who the doctor is, a man who reduced himself to being caretaker of a memorial for victims of San Mérida war and the one who operated him, flaying and grafting the skin of a dying woman who lost her daughter by government strafing run. The man died after the government killed him. He left San Mérida knowing why.

== Media ==
=== Manga ===
The manga series was first serialized in Akita Shoten's shōnen manga magazine Weekly Shōnen Champion from 1973 to 1983. Each of the 25 published tankōbon volumes were divided into 12 to 15 chapters; each chapter is about 20-some pages long. The first episode was called "I Need a Doctor!", and the last episode was called "Prone to Laughter". Most of the manga series had never been directly adapted into anime form until a Black Jack Special was aired in 2003, thus initiating the Black Jack anime series in 2004, and the Black Jack 21 series in 2006.

Vertical Inc. has released translated volumes of the series in the United States, starting with Vol. 1 in September 2008 and finishing with Vol. 17 in November 2011. These collected volumes include a dozen or so stories each in the original unflipped format, and the stories are published in the same order as the Japanese Black Jack collection. Vertical has also released limited editions of the first three volumes that include 1 bonus story each not printed in other editions. In 2026, Kodansha started publishing Black Jack in oversized deluxe hardcover format, starting with 3 collections. The first collection includes Black Jack chapters originally published in color.

Two translated volumes had been previously published by Viz Communications in 1999.

There is also a series called Black Jack ALIVE which was published in 2005, this series was created from numerous artists adding stories onto the original series. A chapter from this series was published in the last volume of "Magetsukan Kitan". In 2013, he is celebrating his 40 anniversary since his first appearance, along with Princess Knight's 60th, and Astro boy's 50th.

A manga called Say Hello to Black Jack by Shūhō Satō has no connection with the Black Jack series, along with its sequel Shin Black Jack ni Yoroshiku.

A 2005 remake of the series was titled Black Jack – Kuroi Ishi.

Another manga called Black Jack NEO was published by a different author. It may be another remake. Not much information is known.

Young Black Jack is another manga, written by Yoshiaki Tabata and illustrated by Yūgo Ōkumaby, featuring Tezuka characters, that started in 2011 in the seinen manga magazine Young Champion and ended in 2019. The story follows Black Jack as a medical student in the 1960s.

In November 2023, a new 32-page manga co-produced by Tezuka Productions and AI was launched in Akita Shoten's Weekly Shōnen Champion magazine, as a part of the "TEZUKA2023" project and to commemorate the Black Jack's 50th anniversary. The project's team selected the most suitable story and characters from a variety of options, which were generated by AI based on Tezuka's works. Finally, a completely new story of the Black Jack manga, created collaboratively by both AI and humans, was published.

=== Anime ===
The first televised appearance of Black Jack was in the 1980 remake of Tetsuwan Atom. Episode 27 of Astro Boy brought together three separate Tezuka creations, as Astro, Uran, Doctor Roget (Black Jack) and Penny (Pinoko) travel back through time to 15th Century Molavia (Silverland). In this storyline, Black Jack performs a life-saving operation on a critically injured Princess Sapphire (from Ribbon no Kishi), while Astro and Uran fend off Gor, a malevolent magician bent on usurping the throne. Characteristically, Roget/Black Jack refuses to operate until he is offered the key to the treasury vault, but later takes only one commemorative coin from the grateful court (which turns out to be worth $200,000,000 when he returns to Astro's time).

Black Jack also made a cameo appearance in the theatrical film Phoenix 2772 as an interstellar prison warden, and is one of the main characters of the TV movie One Million-Year Trip: Bandar Book, in which he plays the role of a space pirate, somehow similar in concept to Leiji Matsumoto's Captain Harlock.

==== Original video animation ====
In 1992, Tezuka's protégé Osamu Dezaki directed a theatrical film and a ten OVA series which were released between 1993 and 2000. Six OVAs, along with the film, were originally only available in dub-only VHS form in North America, but the ten OVAs have since been released on bilingual Region 1 DVD. Wizard selected the series as their "Anime Pick of the Month" for August 1997, calling it "one of the darkest and hardest-hitting made-for-video series of recent years." A further two OVAs were released in 2011 and were referred to as Black Jack Final. In Black Jack Final Osamu Dezaki was posthumously credited as honorary director. (Note: Certain production materials belonging to Dezaki, such as storyboards, were recovered and used for the series. The credits posthumously credit Dezaki as シリーズ名誉監督 (Series Honorary Director).)

==== TV series ====
In 2003, a four-episode TV promotional special aired called Black Jack Special: The 4 Miracles of Life.

From 11 October 2004, through to 6 March 2006, an original television series was aired called Black Jack, featuring 61 episodes. The series is an adaptation of Tezuka's original manga. The TV show can currently be viewed for free on Viki (website) and Crunchyroll. Anime Sols has successfully crowd-funded the first 26 episodes of it for DVD release, starting from Episode 0. Right Stuf and Crunchyroll are currently selling extra copies of the first boxset through their website.

From 10 April 2006, through to 4 September of the same year, a sequel series of seventeen episodes was aired, called Black Jack 21 (Black Jack for the 21st century). Adapted from standalone manga chapters, Black Jack 21 features an all-new overarching story line involving Jack's father and a powerful mysterious organization who try to assassinate Jack. Though the Black Jack 21 series has never been licensed in the U.S., there are several subtitled versions available on the internet.

The previous two anime, Black Jack and Black Jack 21, depart somewhat from the manga by changing the setting to the early 2000s, allowing for flat-screen LCD computer displays and other items not present in the 1973–83 manga. The episodes are based on chapters from the Black Jack manga, either in part or full, sometimes combining two stories in one episode, and also slightly modified to lighten stories' serious issues and overtones. Background and supporting characters such as Largo the dog, Wato, Sharaku and Hige were added and used for comic relief or to support Pinoko when the doctor was not present.

On 1 October 2015, a twelve episode anime entitled Young Black Jack began to air, about Black Jack's adventures as a medical student. It is based on the spin-off manga of the same title written by Yoshiaki Tabata and illustrated by Yūgo Ōkuma. More closely following the timeline of the original 1973–83 manga by Osamu Tezuka, the new anime is however somewhat discontinuous with the 2004 anime.

While Young Black Jack is set in the late 1960s against the backdrop of activism against the Vietnam War, the 2004 anime is set in the early 2000s, representing nearly a 40-year time difference, even though Black Jack appears to have aged less than 10 years between them.

==== Original net animation ====
An original net animation (ONA) adaptation comprising 12 episodes, also known as Black Jack Internet or Black Jack Flash, was released in 2001–2002 and only available via a subscription online download. The series was created using Flash animation which had the unique "Zapping system" and "Action system". The "Zapping system" allowed gave the viewer an option to change the camera viewpoint and the "Action system" was used mostly for comical effect.

==== Films ====
In 1996, two films of the series were made: the first Black Jack: The Movie, a full-length feature, and the second Black Jack: Capital Transfer To Heian, a special 10-minute short.

In December 2005, a third film entitled Black Jack: The Two Doctors of Darkness was released. The film describes Black Jack's attempts to prevent a group known as the Ghost of Icarus from starting a widespread, biological war which could wipe out humanity, while working alongside the infamous Dr. Kiriko.

==== Shorts ====
A 7-minute short called Dr. Pinoko no Mori no Bōken (Dr.ピノコの森の冒険; "Dr. Pinoko's Forest Adventure") was shown before Black Jack: The Two Doctors of Darkness (ブラック・ジャック ふたりの黒い医者, Burakku Jakku: Futari no Kuroi Isha).

=== Live-action ===
- The first live-action adaptation of a Black Jack story was the 1977 film Hitomi no naka no houmonsha (瞳の中の訪問者 – "The Visitor in the Eye" AKA "The Eye's Visitor"), directed by Hausu director Nobuhiko Ôbayashi and starring Jō Shishido as Blackjack. Although the whole film is live-action, the opening titles are animated in Tezuka's signature style.
- In 1981 started the TV drama series Kayama Yuzo no Blackjack, which, as the title suggests, stars actor Yūzō Kayama as Blackjack. In this version, Blackjack's origin story is changed and he is given a secret identity as Miro Ban do, a businessman and owner of an art gallery. The series aired on TV Asahi from 8 January, to 9 April 1981, and lasted 13 episodes.
- In 1996, three Black Jack direct-to-video films were released by Bandai Visual, starring Daisuke Ryu as Black Jack and Honami Tajima as Pinoko. The 3 titles are Black Jack, Black Jack 2: Pinoko I Love You and Black Jack 3: Black Mirror Image.
- In 2000–2001, a series of three made-for-TV movies were aired on the TBS (Tokyo Broadcasting System) TV channel. They were directed by Yukihiko Tsutsumi and starred Masahiro Motoki as Blackjack.
- Young Black Jack (ヤング ブラック・ジャック) is a reinvention of Black Jack's origin story, starring Masaki Okada as a young Kurō Hazama, before he became known as Black Jack. It started airing on 23 April 2011.
- Chinese film production company Beijing Enlight Media is developing a live-action internet film series adaptation of Black Jack with 13 films planned and also a theatrical feature film.

=== Appearances in other media ===
An anime version of the character was seen in an ad teaming up with Dr. House from House for the promotion of the latter in Japan. Black Jack also appears as a playable character in the 2019 puzzle game Crystal Crisis. Animoca Brands added Black Jack as well as Pinoko and Dr. Kiriko as playable characters to its game Crazy Defense Heroes in 2020. Additionally, Black Jack makes a cameo in the 2004 Astro Boy (PlayStation 2 game), giving players a side quest storyline.

== Reception and legacy ==
Black Jack is considered one of the greatest manga of all time, and among Tezuka's best manga, alongside Astro Boy and Phoenix. In 2006, the Japan Media Arts Festival held an 'experts' ranking for the 'Greatest Manga of All Time'. Black Jack ranked 5th, behind Phoenix and just ahead of Astro Boy. In 2009, the Asahi Shimbun held a poll for the 'Greatest Shōwa Manga'. Black Jack ranked 9th on the list, behind Astro Boy and just ahead of Phoenix.

In addition, Black Jack ushered in Weekly Shōnen Champion's most successful period ever, an era when Champion was the best-selling manga magazine, as well as marking Tezuka's resurgence, which had taken a hit from the rise of gekiga. It consistently ranks among the most popular manga of all time, and ranked 18th in a 2021 popularity poll conducted by TV Asahi, the highest ranked Champion manga, and the highest ranked Tezuka manga. In addition, it ranked 1st in a 2020 poll asking for the 'Greatest Champion Manga of All Time'. The character of Black Jack is also one of the most iconic manga characters ever, and has acted as a mascot for Japan's marrow donation service, and even for a 'Partner Agent' service.

Video game designer Yuji Horii and manga artist Hirohiko Araki stated themselves to be fans, and counted the work amongst their favorite of Tezuka's.

It is also one of three manga that are most frequently found in Japanese schools, due to being deemed to have educational value, alongside Barefoot Gen, and the manga adaptation of The Tale of Genji.

Black Jack has also influenced numerous real doctors to enter the practice.

About.com's Deb Aoki listed Black Jack as the best "re-issue of previously released material" of 2008.

== Museum ==
Between 3 March – 27 June 2016, the Osamu Tezuka Manga Museum located in Takarazuka City, Hyōgo Prefecture, Japan, sponsored an art exhibit focused on the "Heroines of Osamu Tezuka". It highlighted the leading ladies of Tezuka's comics, such as Sapphire of Princess Knight and Pinoko of Black Jack.

== See also ==
- Osamu Tezuka's Star System
- Strange Case of Dr Jekyll and Mr Hyde
