= Astro Boy (disambiguation) =

Astro Boy is a Japanese media franchise.

Astro Boy may also refer to:

== Comics ==
- Astro Boy (character), the main character in Astro Boy media
- Astro Boy (Akira Himekawa), a manga by Akira Himekawa
- The Original Astro Boy, an American comic book series by NOW Comics

== Film and television ==
- Astro Boy (1963 TV series), the first television series
- Astro Boy (1980 TV series), the second television series
- Astro Boy (2003 TV series), the third television series
- Astro Boy (film), a CGI movie released in 2009

== Music ==
- "Astroboy (and the Proles on Parade)", a song by The Buggles from The Age of Plastic
- "Astro Boy" a song by Blonde Redhead from Blonde Redhead
- "Astroboy", a song by FEMM from Femm-Isation

== Video games ==
- Mighty Atom (1988 video game), the 1988 Famicom video game produced by Konami
- Mighty Atom (1994 video game), the 1994 Super Famicom video game by Banpresto
- Astro Boy (2004 video game), a video game for the PlayStation 2
- Astro Boy: Omega Factor, the 2004 video game for the Game Boy Advance
- Astro Boy: The Video Game, based on the 2009 CGI animated film of the same name
