= Osamu Tezuka's Star System =

Fictional characters

Osamu Tezuka's Star System (手塚漫画のキャラクター一覧, Tezuka Manga no Kyarakutā Ichiran; lit. The Tezuka Manga Character List) is the name given to the recurring characters in manga created by manga artist Osamu Tezuka. Throughout his career, Tezuka frequently re-used the same character designs or names in different roles across his series; for example, the character Shunsaku Ban appears as a detective in Metropolis and as Astro Boy's teacher in Astro Boy. The name alludes to the Hollywood practice of the star system, and can be seen as analogous to film directors who work with the same actors across multiple films; Tezuka joked about how much his characters were paid, and occasionally based them on famous western actors.

== Primary characters ==
=== Akira Asagumo ===
Akira Asagumo is the grandson of the scientist Dr. Asagumo. He gets his super human powers from the chemical called "Big X", which gives him the ability that makes him grow and expand without limits. He appeared in Shōnen Bool from 1963 to 1966.

=== Astro Boy ===
Atom (Japanese: アトム, Hepburn: Atomu) is a principal "actor". He is shown in the famous manga and assorted versions of the anime as a child robot, usually wearing shorts (which are actually part of his body), identified by his trademark, two pointy "cowlicks" on the front and back of his head. In the manga, his good nature and incorruptible heart, combined with an array of powers, put him on a quest to protect robots and humans from villainous conquerors and alien invaders. He made other appearances in other manga including Black Jack's, in which he plays a major role in at least one story (volume 22 of the English manga release by Dark Horse of Astro Boy) and in the anime Undersea Super Train: Marine Express, in which he is called "Adam". Astro resembles the wooden boy Pinocchio.

=== Black Jack ===
Black Jack (ブラック・ジャック, Burakku Jakku) is a cold-natured, eerie, yet kindhearted and ingenious surgeon is one of Tezuka's dearest creations, despite the fact that in the present day he receives little credit compared to his rival Astro Boy. Black Jack is, according to Tezuka, his alter ego. Black Jack refuses to get a medical license, due to the corruption within medicine practices, and may run into the legal forces while doing operations (in the 2006 TV anime Black Jack finally gets his license). Despite his outlaw status, he is considered a miracle worker with his incomparable surgical technique and power of diagnostic analysis. His operations are generally over 10 million yen, but he more frequently helps the unfortunate for free or a token payment. He is sometimes accompanied by his short-tempered adopted daughter/assistant, Pinoko and can be recognized by a large cape, loose trench coat, and blue, black or red string tie (depending on the media) with black and white hair, dark eyes, and a graft of dark skin across the upper left of his face. Having learned wit playing with darts as a boy, is a skilled marksman as well as well-trained in martial arts. A statue of Black Jack stands in the Osamu Tezuka Museum beneath a skylight.

=== Bokko, Pukko and Nokko ===
Bokko, Pukko and Nokko are a trio of three intergalactic patrollers known as the Amazing 3. They came to Earth to research and destroy it if necessary. They appeared in Weekly Shōnen Sunday from May 1965 to May 1966.

=== Don Dracula ===
Don Dracula
- Osamu Tezuka's Star System character
- First appearance: Weekly Shōnen Champion (May 28, 1979)
- Last appearance: Weekly Shōnen Champion (December 10, 1979)
- Created by: Osamu Tezuka
- Voiced by: Kōichi Chiba (Undersea Super Train: Marine Express (1979)); Kenji Utsumi (Don Dracula (1982))

In-universe information
- Alias: Dondora
- Species: Vampire
- Gender: Male
- Title: Count
- Occupation: Prince of Darkness
- Significant others: Igor (servant); Carmilla (ex-wife)
- Children: Chocola (daughter)
- Home: Transylvania
- Nationality: Romanian

Don Dracula (ドン・ドラキュラ, Don Dorakyura) is a comical vampire who moved from Transylvania to Japan and has a hard time adjusting to the new place. In the animated film Marine Express and the video game Astro Boy: Omega Factor, Don Dracula is a villain who works for Sharaku.

=== Garon ===
Garon
- Osamu Tezuka's Star System character
- First appearance: Boukenoh (July 1959)
- Created by: Osamu Tezuka
- Voiced by: Unshō Ishizuka (The Three-Eyed One)

Garon (ガロン) is a giant robot sent by aliens as a test for Earth's inhabitants. His original comic, Majin Garon, ran in Boukenoh (Japanese: 冒険王, lit. 'Adventure King') from July 1959 until July 1962. He is the final boss of the video game Astro Boy: Omega Factor and the secret treasure of Mu.

=== Ham Egg ===
Ham Egg
- Osamu Tezuka's Star System character
- First appearance: The Old Man's Treasure Island (unpublished, drawn and written 1945—1947)
- Created by: Osamu Tezuka
- Voiced by: Gilbert Mack (Kimba the White Lion (1965)); Ichirō Nagai (Astro Boy (1980 TV series)) (Japanese); Greg Zerkle (Astro Boy (1980 TV series)) (English); Kei Tomiyama (The New Adventures of Kimba The White Lion (1989)) (Japanese); Danshi Tatekawa (Jungle Emperor Leo (1997)) (Japanese); Ted Lewis (Jungle Emperor Leo (1997)) (English); Masashi Ebara (Metropolis (2001)) (Japanese); Robert Axelrod (Metropolis (2001)) (English); Chō (Astro Boy (2003 TV series)) (Japanese); Wally Wingert (Astro Boy (2003 TV series)) (English); Nathan Lane (Astro Boy (2009))

Ham Egg (ハム・エッグ, Hamu Eggu), also known as Cachatore, Hammond Eggs, Hamegg, or Simon Sakely (in Jungle Emperor Leo) is a villain with a round head, a thin moustache, a wide grin, curly hair and sometimes a top hat. His name is an obvious play on the words "ham and eggs".

He is primarily known for being a cruel circus manager in Astro Boy. He was also a hotel manager and an organ smuggler in Phoenix. He made other appearances in Astro Boy (such as a gangster or a murderous surgeon). In Kimba the White Lion, he portrays the hunter who kills Kimba's father, Panja, and holds him captive during his infancy.

=== Higeoyaji ===
Shunsaku Ban
- Osamu Tezuka's Star System character
- First appearance: Ghost Man (unpublished, drawn and written on April 23, 1945)
- Created by: Osamu Tezuka
- Voiced by: Kosei Tomita (1977-2015); Mahito Tsujimura (The New Adventures of Kimba The White Lion); Kazuo Kumakura (Astro Boy (1980-1981)); Kenichi Ogata (The Three-Eyed One); Joji Yanami (The Prince of Devil Island: The Three-Eyed One); Masaaki Yajima (Astro Boy (1963-2006)); Ayao Wada (Astro Boy (1963-2006)); Chikao Otsuka (Phoenix 2772); Takeshi Sagami (Galaxy Boy Troop); Ryan Stiles (Astro Boy (2009)); Kengo Kawanishi (Atom: The Beginning); Akihiko Ishizumi (Go Astro Boy Go!)

In-universe information
- Aliases: Edgar Pompous; Percival Pompous; Mr. Mustache; Albert Duncan; Max McNugget; Monsieur Morse; Wally Kisaragi
- Nicknames: Higeoyaji; Daddy Walrus; Mustachio
- Species: Human
- Gender: Male
- Occupation: Private investigator Schoolteacher; Cook
- Relatives: Ken'ichi (nephew); Yuko Kisaragi (niece)
- Home: Kanda, Tokyo
- Nationality: Japanese

Shunsaku Ban (伴俊作, Ban Shunsaku), or Shunsuke Ban, is a bald, portly, middle-aged man with a large chalk-white moustache. He is an often comical and grumpy yet good-natured. He is 42 years old, as mentioned in one of the manga. His facial hair earns him the nickname "Higeoyaji" (ヒゲオヤジ, "Old Man Mustache"). In the 1960s English version of the animated Astro Boy, his name was private detective Edgar Pompous, then Percival Pompous. Perhaps because his character was appearing in another animated series based on Tezuka's manga at the time, in the 1980s English animated Astro Boy changed his name to Albert Duncan, and he was given the nickname "Daddy Walrus". His typical role is that of a detective in other Tezuka materials, with sometimes a nephew/assistant named Ken'ichi ("Ken" or "Kennedy" in English versions of the Astro Boy TV series). The 1980s color remake (as well as the original manga) had him appear as Astro Boy's teacher, then as a detective. In the 2003 Astro Boy series, he is called Wally Kisaragi, and in the English-language manga, his "Higeoyaji" nickname is translated as "Mustachio". He is featured as either a regular character or a guest star in any of a number of Tezuka works. Shunsaku Ban is often cast as some sort of adventurer, usually an amateur or professional private investigator. His trademark characteristic is to confront danger with a comical wild-eyed panic, then after a moment recapture his composure and vigorously attack the threat.

=== Hosuke Sharaku ===
Hosuke Sharaku (写楽保介, Sharaku Hōsuke) is a baby-faced young boy with a large head, often sporting a bandage. His main role was in The Three-Eyed One where he is a three-eyed child with evil powers. He has featured in Astro Boy-related media, appearing as the main antagonist in the game Astro Boy: Omega Factor and as a supporting character in the PlayStation 2 game Astro Boy. He was Assaji the apprentice monk in Buddha, still with his bandage. He appeared in the Black Jack anime, also with his bandage. Sharaku's third eye is hidden by the bandage, which suppresses both his power and evil nature.

=== Kenichi ===
Kenichi (ケン一 Ken'ichi) is one of Tezuka's oldest and most often cast "actors". Kenichi's character design is borrowed from Dick Huemer's Scrappy, initially confused as "Happie". He is also known as Kenichi Shikishima, which is a name derived from his role in Lost World. Fans gave him this name to help distinguish him, although it is not officially recognized by Tezuka Productions. The Japanese writing of his name, "ケン一" is unique as it is a pun on the number one in Japanese (ichi) written as "一" in kanji, so it is like saying "Kenichi number one". Alternate spellings include "Ken1", "ケン1", and in English he is known as Kennedy or simply Ken. He is often paired with Higeoyaji, who usually takes the role of his uncle.

Kenichi can be recognized by his soft round face with one or several curls poking out of his hair, also known as a cowlick or ahoge. He sometimes has simple dotted cartoon eyes reminiscent of Tintin, but later on he is drawn with more detailed irises. He is also often seen wearing shoes that are half white in the back and dark in the front, but this could be a way of stylizing spats.

Kenichi would often take the role of the main hero in Tezuka's early works, but Tezuka would later revoke his role as the protagonist because he "lacked individuality". The manga world was becoming more focused on more complex characters, and Kenichi embodied the one-dimensional, wholesome, "good boy" status of early childhood, but not much else. Eventually, readers lost interest in him. After he was retired as a main protagonist, he would usually take a supporting role in other stories, such as Astro Boy's classmate and Leo's friend in Jungle Emperor.

In 1954 Tezuka created a manga that was focused on Kenichi as the hero, because he still liked the character very much. In Chief Detective Kenichi (ケン1探偵長), the plot follows Kenichi, who is a young detective solving various crimes with his pet bird Donguri. This would be one of his last roles as the main hero.

=== Osamu Tezuka ===
Osamu Tezuka (手塚 治虫, Tezuka Osamu) himself makes frequent appearances, usually just as an in-joke, in nearly all of his works. He can be recognized by his round spotted nose and round glasses and sometimes wears a beret. In the collected Astro Boy volumes, he often introduces stories, and dispenses trivia.

He is a major character in the manga The Vampires. Tezuka went so far as to play the role himself in the 1968 TV adaptation of the series. He also makes frequent appearances in the Black Jack anime, in which, as a doctor, he is a former classmate of Black Jack's.

=== Rock ===
Rock (ロック, Rokku) is a young "bad boy" with shiny dark hair, sometimes wearing sunglasses. He mostly plays villains, after having played juvenile heroes. He made his first appearance in Rock Holmes, as a child detective. He appeared with Astro Boy several times. He was in Phoenix. He also starred in animated Osamu Tezuka's Metropolis as Duke Red's brutal son. In the Astro Boy: Omega Factor video game he is initially the real identity of the villain, Deadcross, but falls in love with - and is reformed by - Princess Sapphire, and remains with her in the distant past to help her try to avert the demise of the continent of Mu, similar to what happened in the Marine Express film.

=== Leo ===
Leo
- Osamu Tezuka's Star System character
- First appearance: Manga Shōnen (November 1950)
- Last appearance: Manga Shōnen (April 1954)
- Created by: Osamu Tezuka
- Voiced by: Yoshiko Ōta (Kimba the White Lion (1965) and Jungle Emperor Leo (1966)); Takashi Toyama (Leo the Lion (1966)); Megumi Hayashibara (The New Adventures of Kimba the White Lion (1989), young); Shinnosuke Furumoto (The New Adventures of Kimba the White Lion (1989), adult); Masane Tsukayama (Jungle Emperor Leo (1997)); Kyoko Tsuruno (Jungle Emperor Leo: Hon-o-ji (2000)); Taeko Kawata (Jungle Emperor: The Brave Can Change the Future (2009))

In-universe information
- Alias: Kimba
- Species: White lion
- Gender: Male
- Occupation: King of Beasts
- Family: Panja (father) (deceased); Eliza (mother) (deceased)
- Significant other: Lyre
- Children: Lune (son); Lukio (daughter)
- Relatives: Leona (sister)
- Home: Africa
- Nationality: African

Leo (レオ, Reo) is a courageous, vegetarian white lion with black tips on his ears. Often known as "Kimba" in English-language translations, after he was given that name in Kimba the White Lion, the English dub of his 1960s anime series. In both his manga and anime series, he is known as Jungle Emperor Leo and acts as an ambassador toward the human world for animals. In Astro Boy: Omega Factor an android boy known as Pook disguises himself as Leo to steal jewels.

=== Magma ===
Magma is a gigantic humanoid who can shapeshift into a rocket ship. With this series, Tezuka pioneered the transforming robots concept.

=== Melmo ===
Melmo is a young girl who usually happens to have a bottle of candy with the power to change her physical appearance. Though most frequently seen as various characters in the Black Jack manga of the 1970s, Melmo appears either as a 9-year-old or a 19-year-old. Although in her own series both versions of Melmo are the same person, she has sometimes appeared as a mother and a daughter.

=== Phoenix ===
Phoenix
- Osamu Tezuka's Star System character
- First appearance: Manga Shōnen (July 1954)
- Last appearance: Yasei Jidai (February 1988)
- Created by: Osamu Tezuka
- Voiced by: Masako Oka (Hi no Tori (1978)); Keiko Takeshita (Phoenix 2772 (1980) and Phoenix (2004)); Masako Ikeda (Phoenix: Karma Chapter (1986), Phoenix: Yamato Chapter (1987) and Phoenix: Space Chapter (1987)); Yumi Touma (The Last Mystery of the 20th Century (2000))

In-universe information
- Aliases: The Firebird; Bird of Fire
- Nickname: Cosmozone 2772
- Species: Phoenix
- Gender: Neutral
- Occupation: Deity

The Phoenix (火の鳥, Hi no Tori) is an immortal alien entity that takes the physical form of a legendary magical mythological bird.

=== Prime Rose ===
Prime Rose (プライム・ローズ) is a girl with bushy reddish-blonde hair. She originally appeared as a black-clad warrior in Prime Rose, a comic series in Weekly Shōnen Champion, which was made into an animated movie in 1983. In Astro Boy: Omega Factor, she is Lamp Acetylene's daughter.

=== Sapphire ===
Sapphire
- Osamu Tezuka's Star System character
- First appearance: Shōjo Club (January 1953)
- Last appearance: Shōjo Friend (April 1968)
- Created by: Osamu Tezuka
- Voiced by: Kazue Takahashi (Princess Knight (1955)); Fuyumi Shiraishi (Princess Knight (1966)); Yoshiko Ōta (Princess Knight (1967) and Undersea Super Train: Marine Express); Mari Okamoto (Astro Boy (1980)); Yumi Touma (Princess Knight (1999) and The Last Mystery of the 20th Century); Rei Sakuma (Black Jack); Mayumi Sho (Black Jack); Aoi Yuki (Young Black Jack)

In-universe information
- Aliases: "Princess Knight" "Phantom Knight"; Princess Angela, Queen of Kilcrikey
- Species: Human
- Gender: Female
- Occupation: Princess
- Family: King (father); Queen (mother)
- Spouse: Franz Charming
- Children: Daisy Charming (son); Violetta Charming (daughter)
- Home: Silverland
- Nationality: European

Sapphire (サファイア, Safaia) is a young woman with slightly curly dark hair, who first starred in Princess Knight. She is the queen of the Mu civilization in the animated film Marine Express and in the Astro Boy: Omega Factor game.

=== Skunk Kusai ===
Skunk Kusai
- Osamu Tezuka's Star System character
- First appearance: Shōnen (January 1955)
- Created by: Osamu Tezuka
- Voiced by: Seizō Katō (Astro Boy (1980 TV series)) (Japanese); Jay Rath (Astro Boy (1980 TV series)) (English); Fumihiko Tachiki (The Three-Eyed One)

Skunk Kusai (スカンク 草井, Sukanku Kusai) is a pale, blonde smirking man with a short brown nose, sleepy eyes, and sometimes a gray complexion (which is made clear in the 1980 Astro Boy anime). He usually plays a villain. His full name is often displayed as Skunk Kusai (Kusai means "stinky", "fishy" in Japanese). He is primarily known for being a gangster enemy to Astro Boy. He first appeared in Metropolis as an overly ambitious military officer.

=== Unico ===
Unico
- Osamu Tezuka's Star System character
- First appearance: Ririka (November 1976)
- Last appearance: Ririka (March 1979)
- Created by: Osamu Tezuka
- Voiced by: Hiroya Oka (Unico: Black Cloud, White Feather (1979)); Katsue Miwa (The Fantastic Adventures of Unico (1981) and Unico in the Island of Magic (1983)); Barbara Goodson (English dubs of The Fantastic Adventures of Unico (1981) and Unico in the Island of Magic (1983); Akiko Yajima (Saving Our Fragile Earth: Unico Special Chapter (2000); Rumiko Tezuka (Dr. Pinoko's Forest Adventures (2005)); Haruna Kawai (Kemono Friends 3); Hana Ayasaka (Promotional Motion comic for Unico: Awakening only (2025))

In-universe information
- Species: Unicorn
- Gender: Male
- Occupation: Legendary creature
- Family: Mother (manga, 1981 movie, and OEL manga reboot); Father (manga and OEL manga reboot); Unnamed brothers and sisters (manga, 1981 movie, and OEL manga reboot); Corn (manga and OEL Manga)
- Significant others: Psyche (mistress); Zephyrus/West Wind (legal guardian)
- Home: Greece
- Nationality: Greek

Unico (ユニコ, Yuniko) is a baby unicorn born with a special gift of making anyone happy.

== Secondary characters ==
=== Acetylene Lamp ===
Acetylene Lamp (アセチレン・ランプ, Asechiren Ranpu), also known as Drake (or Torch in the second series), is a tall, middle-aged man with a thin nose, large forehead, wide frowny eyes and often a small mustache with big glasses. He has a "notch" on the back of his head. A running gag throughout Tezuka's work show that a lit candle will stand upright if placed in the notch. Tezuka based the character on a classmate. He appeared regularly in Astro Boy and in Tezuka's Adolf, Black Jack and in Phoenix. He was the president's secretary in Osamu Tezuka's Metropolis in which the candle appears on his head when he is shot. The candle is a plot point in the game Astro Boy: Omega Factor where his daughter proves it is her by remembering that. He also appeared in Bagi, the Monster of Mighty Nature, and cameos in Jungle Emperor Leo.

=== Atlas ===
Atlas is a robot created by Dr. Ram, an Incan scientist who hates civilization, to get revenge on a Mexican village. Atlas turns against his creator and leaves him to be burned by the flowing lava caused by an artificial volcanic eruption, but Astro manages to defeat Atlas.

He has been reimagined in many adaptations which turned him into Astro's half-brother, Skunk's creation, or even Prime Rose's boyfriend.

=== Biwamaru ===
Biwamaru is a tall, thin bald man; he is completely blind and his eyes are white. His left eye is larger than his right. In Dororo, he is a traveling monk who crosses paths with Hyakkimaru from time to time. In Black Jack, he is a wandering acupuncturist and a rival to Black Jack. He also appears as the Buddhist Priest Tenran in Duke Goblin.

=== Boon Marukubi ===
Boon Marukubi is a bulky man who usually plays the role of a villain and/or politician. He was modeled on the veteran French actor Lino Ventura.

=== Chiyoko Wato ===
Chiyoko Wato (和登千代子, Wato Chiyoko) is a teenage girl usually occupying as a high school student. She is Sharaku's classmate who plays as his best friend, mother figure, and even love interest.

=== Duke Red ===
Duke Red is a tall man with a large, hooked nose and spiky hair on the back of his head. He first appeared in Osamu Tezuka's Metropolis, a name he took back in the game Astro Boy: Omega Factor. He also played the title role in Osamu Tezuka's rendition of Cyrano de Bergerac and Prince Siddartha's doctor in Buddha. He made a few appearances in the Astro Boy manga (such as a mad scientist or a murdered priest) and other Tezuka productions, sometimes under the name Akai ("Red" in Japanese). He appeared in the 2003 Astro Boy TV series, in which he started a war against robots after thinking his robot servant hurt his daughter.

=== Frankenstein ===
Frankenstein (フランケンシュタイン, Furankenshutain) is a mature man with a large hulking build and one eye on the right. He is called "Frankenstein" because he has a grotesque giant face whose uncanny resemblance to the monster created by the eponymous scientist.

=== Dr. Tenma ===
Dr. Tenma is a man whose face and hair resemble that of a rooster. He played the role of Astro's father and creator. He later appeared in a number of other manga including Black Jack.

=== Hecate ===
Hecate is the daughter of Satan and rival then ally of Princess Sapphire.

=== Hyoutan-tsugi ===
Hyoutan-tsugi, also known as Gourdski, is a gag character, a small pig-faced patchworked gourd creature that puffs out smoke. Tezuka sometimes even making a character's face looking like it. It appears in almost all of his works, even in the 2009 CGI animated film where he appears on a billboard. Some fans call it the real star of Tezuka's series.

=== Lord Deadcross ===
Lord Deadcross is the inventor of the first robot president, Rag. He turned into a villain after Rag decided to run against him in the election in Guravia and won. In Astro Boy: Omega Factor, Deadcross is combined with Rock and the leader of the Black Looks while Rag is combined with the Blue Knight.

=== Mitchy ===
Mitchy, also known as Michi, is a young girl character whose most relevant role is as herself in Metropolis where she is an android who changes from male to female as a method of disguise, similar to Princess Sapphire. In the anime adaptation, she is replaced by Tima, an original character that is explicitly stated to be a gynoid, unlike Mitchy who changes gender. She was also recognized by fans as Astro's android mother in the original 1950s-1960s run of the Astro Boy manga.

=== Notaarin ===
Notaarin, also known as Notarlin, is an older, portly character with a round head, sometimes depicted with a moustache and a single hair on the back of his head. He appears as the Superintendent of Police in Osamu Tezuka's Metropolis, also as the Atomic Energy Chairman in the manga version of Nextworld.

=== Professor Ochanomizu ===
Professor Ochanomizu is a mentor of Astro Boy; often seen in Black Jack in positions of authority (councilman, company president, etcetera).

=== Omotanium ===
Omotanium is not a character per se, but a fictional "substance" à la kryptonite. It has different properties and performs different functions from story to story, such as destroying the brain system of a robot.

=== Pick ===
Pick is a young boy who fell to Earth in a meteorite. Garon fell to Earth as well, Pick is actually his heart/conscience, without him he is a soulless monster. Pick is commonly depicted with a "W" on his forehead and wearing overalls. He has appeared in both the Astro Boy and Black Jack manga, sometimes even without Garon. In Astro Boy: Omega Factor, Pick is given the alias and characteristics of Pook a recurring character from Astro Boy.

=== Pinoko ===
Pinoko is the loyal assistant and adopted daughter of Dr. Black Jack.

=== Inspector Tawashi ===
Inspector Tawashi is a police detective with a distrust of robots and therefore has a feud with both Professor Ochanomizu and Shunsuke Ban. While arrogant and even rude, he eventually comes to respect Astro's courage and abilities, even calling for his assistance in particularly difficult cases. He is often partnered with Chief Nakamura.

=== Rainbow Parakeet ===
Rainbow Parakeet is a tall young man with bobbed blue hair, red-tinted sunglasses, a white coat and ascot, and dark pants and gloves. He stars as the title character in his own manga as a thief (à la Lupin III), and as the English cyborg private detective Sherlock Homespun (sometimes written Sherlock Holmespan) in the 1980 Astro Boy anime and Game Boy Advance game Astro Boy: Omega Factor. In the 2003 Astro Boy series he appears as a terrorist named Kato, who has no concrete goal, but regards his terrorism as art.

=== Robita ===
Robita is a robot who appears in Phoenix manga arcs "Future" and "Resurrection". She also has a minor role in the 1980 Astro Boy animated series and more substantial role in the 2003 Astro Boy animated series (named Nora in the English version and voiced by Jennifer Darling). She also appears in Naoki Urasawa's Pluto manga series.

=== Rococo ===
Rococo is an alien mutant created to help evacuate animals from Earth to get away from a toxic cloud.

=== Saboten, Sam ===
Sam Saboten is a young man who replaced Rock in a series known as Saboten-Kun, mimicking the Hollywood practice of replacing actors during a series of films.

=== Saruta ===
Saruta is a stocky man with a huge roundish nose. He appeared as all the Saruta descendants (including Gao) in the Phoenix saga and made some appearances in Buddha. In Black Jack anime series, he appears like Jontaro Honma, the man who reconstructed the body of Black Jack after his accident when he was a kid. He looks somewhat similar to Professor Ochanomizu because he typically has a large, bulbous nose, but he is not the same character.

=== Sasaki, Kojiro ===
Kojiro Sasaki is based on and named after the Japanese swordsman. He is known for his energy, quick temper, and sword skills. Although his first appearance was in Benkei, his break-out role was in Ah, We Three. He also appeared in Black Jack, he has appeared in The Crater, Rainbow Parakeet, Lion Books, and the animated film, Marine Express.

=== Saturn ===
Saturn is a massive, brutal man with a big chin and a pointy moustache. He appeared as the King of Evil in Magic House and he fought Astro Boy as the robot called Satan.

=== Spider ===
Spider is a gag character, a cartoonish and short man in a black robe, long nose, one hair, stretching an arm and often bouncing. His catchphrase is "Here ta meet ya!" and he ends almost every sentence by "Ayup!" He vaguely resembles Kilroy.

== See also ==
- List of Osamu Tezuka anime
- List of Osamu Tezuka manga

== Notes ==
- Part of the Osamu Tezuka Star System with other Tezuka characters is listed and described in the Astro Boy: Omega Factor game, as the "Omega Factor": it is a memory data which raises Astro Boy's power as it levels up. To increase it, Astro has to make full acquaintance of characters throughout the game. This also unlocks biographies of the characters.
