= List of Astro Boy episodes =

List of Astro Boy episodes may refer to:

- List of Astro Boy (1963) episodes
- List of Astro Boy (1980) episodes
- List of Astro Boy (2003) episodes
