= Omega Factor =

Omega Factor may refer to:

- Astro Boy: Omega Factor, video game
- The Omega Factor, BBC TV series
