= Rainbow Parakeet =

Japanese manga series

- The cover for Rainbow Parakeet volume 1 from the Osamu Tezuka Manga Complete Works edition.

七色いんこ (Nana-iro Inko)
- Manga
- Written by: Osamu Tezuka
- Published by: Akita Shoten
- Magazine: Weekly Shōnen Champion
- Original run: March 20, 1981 – May 28, 1983
- Volumes: 7

Rainbow Parakeet (七色いんこ, Nana-iro Inko) (German: Regenbogenfarbener Papagei) is a manga series created by Osamu Tezuka dealing with the adventures of the eponymous phantom thief. Collected in seven volumes, it has been published in France by Asuka.

== Plot ==
Rainbow Parakeet is a genius as an actor, and a thief at the same time. As he is not a full-time thespian, he is usually hired as a replacement. During the performance, he steals from the wealthiest members of the audience or even actors, depriving them of the contents of their purses or their jewelry. (Note: See for example, Episode 3, where he leaves his calling card and steals a piece of jewelry called "Stella Blanca" from an eminent actress.) True to his alias name "Rainbow Parakeet", he can assume the role of almost any part and change into any costume, and his repertoire is immense.

His methods are a mystery, even to the detectives charged with apprehending him: Police Inspector Senri and his daughter, Police Detective Mariko Senri.

== Characters ==
Rainbow Parakeet

A thief who is also a professional mimic (although he called himself a layman in acting), he usually steals from the rich among the audience, causing Detective Senri and her daughter Mariko to pursue him.

Police Inspector Senri

Police Detective Mariko Senri

Inspector Senri's daughter. While she is passionate about capturing Rainbow Parakeet, she is also in love with him.

Tamasaburō

A dog who is as good at disguising himself as Parakeet. Tamasaburo soon joins Parakeet in his work.

Chochin Odawara

Mozuku Tengusa

Clown Tommy

== General remarks ==
The work was serialized in the Weekly Shonen Champion and ran from 1981 to 1982.

Each typical episode adapted or paid homage to a play from the West, or from the Japanese theater, both traditional and modern. Examples include Ibsen (Episode 3: Doll's House) and Shakespeare (Episode 35: The dog Tamasaburō faces the threat of being fed to a lion named Shylock).

The work has been adapted into several stage plays. The 2000 adaptation starred Goro Inagaki as Rainbow Parakeet and Rie Miyazawa as Mariko. The 2018 adaptation featured an all-female cast, with Junna Ito as Rainbow Parakeet and Konoka Matsuda as Mariko.

== Appearances in other media ==
=== Astro Boy (1980 TV series) ===
Parakeet appeared as detective "Sherlock Homespun" in an episode of the 1980s series, where he was an English cyborg private detective who helps Astro Boy recover an artificial sun created to help exploration in Pluto.

=== Astro Boy (2003 TV series) ===
Parakeet is featured in several episodes of the 2003 TV incarnation of Astro Boy as the terrorist Kato.

== Availability in English ==
While the entire series has yet to be translated, three excerpts were included in Tezuka's Shakespeare Manga Theater from Ablaze Publishing.

== See also ==
- List of Osamu Tezuka manga
- Osamu Tezuka's Star System
