= Duke Goblin =

Japanese manga series

- Cover of Duke Goblin volume 1 from the Osamu Tezuka Manga Complete Works edition

ゴブリン公爵 (Goburin Kōshaku)
- Manga
- Written by: Osamu Tezuka
- Published by: Akita Shoten
- Magazine: Weekly Shōnen Champion
- Original run: September 6, 1985 – February 28, 1986
- Volumes: 2

Duke Goblin (ゴブリン公爵, Goburin Kōshaku) is a Japanese manga series written and illustrated by Osamu Tezuka, published from 1985 to 1986.

== Plot ==
In the story, a Japanese boy named Chinki has a dream where he foresees the future. In it, he has excavated a bronze giant from the ruins of Angyang in China. This Todaiki, or "Giant Lighthouse Demon" was constructed by the Yin Dynasty of China, unifying the country for the first time in 3000 years. To them, the giant was a guardian deity to ensure that China remained united, but the giant is a massive robot with psychokinetic power.

Chinki then meets a girl named Aiai who has the power to activate Todaiki, but doesn't know about it. Accidentally, her soul wanders into the giant and gives it power. Against her will, Todaiki goes on a rampage and smashes a town before sinking into the Yellow River. After witnessing all of this, Chinki decides to use Todaiki's power for his own evil ambition. Giving himself the name "Duke Goblin", he seeks to use Todaiki, powered by Aiai's trapped soul, to rule the world.

Opposing Duke Goblin is the Buddhist priest Tenran and male student Kanichi Tokugawa, who has a crush on Aiai.

== Characters ==
- Duke Goblin (Chinki): A Japanese boy who has a dream that foresees the future and of him excavating the bronze giant Todaiki from the Angyang ruins in China. His ambition is to use Todaiki to rule the world under the self-given moniker of "Duke Goblin".
- Aiai: A girl with supernatural psychic powers that she is unaware of. Accidentally, she activates the evil Todaiki with which Duke Goblin hopes to use to rule the world.
- Dr. Shu:
- Hannya:
- Aiai's Stepmother:
- Kanichi Tokugawa: A boy working with the Buddhist Priest Tenran to stop Duke Goblin, and who also has a crush on Aiai.
- 'Buddhist priest Tenran:' A strange Buddhist priest who intends to thwart Duke Goblin's plans of world domination.
- Todaiki: A "Giant Lighthouse Demon" who is a massive robot with psychokinetic power.

== A New Villain ==
Osamu Tezuka created "Duke Goblin" shortly before his death in 1989. Many fans who read the story loved the evil Chinki who had taken the villain role usually reserved for Rock, Tezuka's other main boy villain. Many fans wished that Chinki could have appeared in other stories by Tezuka.

== See also ==
- Osamu Tezuka
- List of Osamu Tezuka manga
- Osamu Tezuka's Star System
