= Saruta =

Saruta (written: 猿田) is a Japanese surname. Notable people with the surname include:

- Haruki Saruta (猿田 遥己, born 1999), Japanese footballer
- Hironori Saruta (猿田 浩得, born 1982), Japanese footballer
- Yosuke Saruta (猿田 洋祐, born 1987), Japanese mixed martial artist

== See also ==
- Saruta Dam, a dam in Niigata Prefecture, Japan
