= List of Astro Boy (2003 TV series) episodes =

The 2003 Astro Boy series is a remake of the 1960s anime black-and-white series of the same name; both series are adapted from the manga series of the same name by Osamu Tezuka. The series aired on Fuji TV from April 6, 2003, to March 28, 2004. A total of four pieces of theme music were used: two opening themes and two ending themes. The first opening theme is "True Blue" by Zone while the ending theme is "Boy's Heart" by Fumiya Fujii. The second opening theme is "Now or Never" by Chemistry and M-Flo while the ending theme is "Mighty Atom" (鉄腕アトム, Tetsuwan Atomu).

== Episodes ==
No.	Title	Directed by	Written by	Storyboarded by	Original release date	English air date
1	"Power Up!"; Transliteration: "Pawā appu!" (Japanese: パワーアップ！)	Keiichirō Mochizuki	Chiaki J. Konaka	Keiichirō Mochizuki	April 6, 2003	January 17, 2004
"Awaken! The world's strongest robot!" Dr. Ochanomizu's voice rings out in a room at the Ministry of Science. The energy of the entire Metro City is captured, and in a blinding light, Atom is finally born. However, Atom's mind is just like that of a newborn child, and his innocent rampage only annoys the people around him. Meanwhile, an incident occurs in which the Geoworm that supplies the city with energy begins to run amok.
2	"Robot Ball"; Transliteration: "Robotto bōru" (Japanese: ロボットボール)	Fumio Maezono	Chiaki J. Konaka	Fumio Maezono	April 13, 2003	January 24, 2004
Harley, a Robot Ball player, is a popular player known for his fair play. However, Harley and the rest of the Omega Knights led by him suddenly turn into violent players who ignore the rules. They are actually being manipulated by Dr. Tenma, whose goal is to show the audience an ugly fight between robots. The fighters engage in a horrible battle full of foul play and that turns the audience away. Harley then turns to Atom and demands a fight.
3	"Atom Goes to Space" / "Destination Deimos"; Transliteration: "Atomu uchū e iku" (Japanese: アトム宇宙へ行く)	Yukio Suzuki	Chiaki J. Konaka	Hiromitsu Morita	April 20, 2003	March 10, 2004
The mining robots on the planet Deimos have suddenly begun to act against human orders. When Dr. Ochanomizu hears the news, he heads for Deimos. Atom is ordered to stay behind, but he sneaks into the spaceship and goes with him. The planet is in turmoil because of the mining robots that keep digging holes without permission. As Atom desperately searches for the reason behind the robots' rebellion, he uncovers a surprising truth.
4	"Lightning" / "Into Thin Air"; Transliteration: "Denkō" (Japanese: 電光)	Keiichirō Mochizuki	Ai Ōta	Fumihiro Yoshimura	April 27, 2003	March 11, 2004
Atom starts to go to school and makes friends with kids named Kenichi, Tamao, and Shibugaki. By chance, he also becomes friends with a mysterious robot named Lightning, who can disappear. The five of them deepen their friendship by playing with a sailboat. However, Lightning turns out to be a thief controlled by the villainous Skunk Kusai. When Atom and his friends realize this, they try to stop Lightning from doing evil deeds.
5	"Save the Robot Farm!" / "Rainbow Canyon"; Transliteration: "Robotto nōjō o sukue!!" (Japanese: ロボット農園を救え！！)	Yukio Suzuki	Ai Ōta	Noboru Furuse	May 4, 2003	March 15, 2004
In a place called the Rainbow Canyon, there is a robot farm. The weather is unstable, but the area is protected by an environmental control tower built by Dr. Toneriko, and robots called Vegeta are working hard to grow giant vegetables. Then a young man named Katari appears. Dr. Toneriko's daughter, Mimi, begins to look up to him like an older brother, but he actually hates robots and has come to the farm to ruin their reputation. He takes over the tower, shakes the crust of the Rainbow Canyon and causes earthquakes, and the giant vegetables fall off the branches one after another, injuring Dr. Toneriko. The earthquake gradually spreads to the surrounding areas of the Rainbow Canyon, triggering the collapse of the dam.
6	"Birth of Atlas" / "Atlas"; Transliteration: "Atorasu tanjō" (Japanese: アトラス誕生)	Satoshi Kuwabara	Keiichi Hasegawa	Satoshi Kuwabara	May 11, 2003	January 31, 2004
Tokugawa, the general of the Tokugawa conglomerate, asks Dr. Tenma to create a robot that will recreate his dead son, Daichi. Tokugawa intends for the robot to succeed him in his position. However, Daichi is reborn with memories of hating his father and humans, and changes his name to Atlas to attack humans. The appearance of a robot that attacks humans terrifies people. Atom tries to convince Atlas not to attack people, but to no avail. Daichi claims he is Atlas and destroys the Tokugawa headquarters building at a meeting to choose the successor. No one knows what made him do it. Atom finally decides to confront Atlas.
7	"Atom vs. Atlas" / "Astro vs. Atlas"; Transliteration: "Atomu vs Atorasu" (Japanese: アトムvsアトラス)	Satoshi Kuwabara	Keiichi Hasegawa	Satoshi Kuwabara	May 18, 2003	February 7, 2004
Dr. Ochanomizu tells the whole secret of Atom's birth. It was that Atom's birth father was actually Dr. Tenma, who had created him as a replacement for his son, Tobio, and then abandoned him. Atom is deeply hurt and troubled. At the same time, Atlas, who was defeated by Atom, is regenerated by Dr. Tenma with even more power. Atlas destroys the Tokugawa conglomerate's spaceport and heads for the Moon. Atom heads to the Moon to stop Atlas from running amok. Tokugawa also goes there to bury the monster that he has created, and all three have a face-off. In the midst of the battle, the facility is destroyed and everyone is about to be pushed out into space when a memory comes back to Atlas's mind and the situation changes.
8	"Robot Super Express" / "Neon Express"; Transliteration: "Robotto chōtokkyū" (Japanese: ロボット超特急)	Yukio Suzuki	Sadayuki Murai	Hiromitsu Morita	May 25, 2003	March 18, 2004
Dr. Katō plants a bomb on the Neon Lights, the first ever fully robotic train. He says that the bomb will explode when the train's speed drops below 70 kilometers per hour with a large number of passengers on board. There is an energy plant, Geoworm, in the train's path, and if it doesn't stop, a catastrophe will occur. Atom, who is on board, desperately searches for the bomb to save the people, but even with the latest-model scans, he cannot find it.
9	"Franken"; Transliteration: "Furanken" (Japanese: フランケン)	Fumihiro Yoshimura	Sadayuki Murai	Osamu Dezaki	June 1, 2003	March 22, 2004
Deep in the mountains, there is a valley where broken robots are piled up. People posing as robot collectors are illegally dumping robots that should have been reclaimed. One robot rose from the pile. As if to make up for the missing parts, the robot attached various discarded parts to its body, making it look like Frankenstein's monster. The robot shouted unintelligible words as it headed towards the town, and is attacked by the police and the robot squad, but secretly escapes from the ground. The robot goes to a boy named Taku, who is in the same school as Atom. The robot was the one from Taku's place, and was wandering around, calling for him, looking for his good friend. Taku, on the other hand, is looking for Al, who was supposed to have been taken away by a collection agency, and is reunited with him, but he doesn't recognize him because of his changed appearance. On the contrary, he runs away when he sees Al in his horrible form.
10	"Attack of the Venusian Robots!" / "The Venus Robots"; Transliteration: "Kinsei robotto shūrai!" (Japanese: 金星ロボット襲来！)	Yukio Suzuki	Keiichi Hasegawa	Yukio Suzuki	June 8, 2003	March 23, 2004
A mysterious object is pulled out of the sea. When Dr. Ochanomizu investigates, he finds that it is a Venus robot that was discarded at the bottom of the ocean 20 years ago without being used. Atom discovers that the Venusian robots, who have forgotten what they were created for, are building a city on the ocean floor, waiting for a captain to give them a mission. However, there was one other person who knew about the existence of the Venusian robots—Dr. Tenma. He calls himself the Captain and tries to manipulate the Venusian robots to freeze Metro City with their cooling devices. Following the words of the captain, the Venusian robots head for Metro City, believing it to be for their happiness. Atom and Ochanomizu try to stop them, but in the end, one of the cooling systems is turned on. In an effort to save the people in danger, Atom takes it upon himself to try to rescue everyone at the risk of his own safety.
11	"The Robot Circus is Here!" / "Robot Circus"; Transliteration: "Robotto sākasu ga yattekita!" (Japanese: ロボットサーカスがやって来た！)	Kazuo Yamazaki	Ai Ōta	Kazuo Yamazaki	June 15, 2003	March 31, 2004
Atom and Dr. Ochanomizu visit the town of Bellanotte, where they see a robot circus. Atom then realizes that there is a human boy among the robots. The boy, Reno, was an abandoned child raised by the robots. When Reno tells Atom that he will be separated from everyone if the truth gets out, Atom promises not to tell anyone. However, the town's don, Gustav, who is an enemy of the robots, finds out Reno's secret, makes up a story that the robots have kidnapped the child, and tracks down the robots to dismantle them.
12	"Jumbo Revived" / "Reviving Jumbo"; Transliteration: "Yomigaetta Janbo" (Japanese: よみがえったジャンボ)	Shigeharu Takahashi	Kenji Konuta	Masayoshi Nishida	June 22, 2003	March 23, 2004
In a corner of Marine Park, there is a robot named Jumbo, who seems to have fallen apart and been completely forgotten by the people. There is a girl who has spent her whole life gazing at Jumbo. It's Midori, Atom's homeroom teacher. One day, Jumbo is remodeled by a gang of villains and starts working again. The goal is to break Skunk out of his prison cell. The prison where Skunk was held has a device called the Guardian Pulse to prevent escape using machines, but the old robot Jumbo is unaffected by this. Atom and the police try to stop Jumbo from rampaging through the prison to get Skunk out, but the Guardian Pulse prevents them from doing so. Midori and Atom try their best to talk to Jumbo and remind him of his old kind heart, while also trying to stop Skunk from escaping.
13	"Birth of Uran" / "Little Sister, Big Trouble"; Transliteration: "Uran tanjō" (Japanese: ウラン誕生)	Yukio Suzuki	Ai Ōta	Yukio Suzuki	July 6, 2003	April 1, 2004
Atom's younger sister, Uran, is born. Uran, who has the power to read the minds of animals, is told by a bird to notice the existence of an eerie pterosaur robot flying in the night sky, but when she tells Atom about it, he doesn't take her seriously, saying she must have been dreaming. Uran, who has no choice but to go looking for the pterosaur alone, learns that the pterosaur robot was created by Dr. Poppotore, an antiquity biologist, who was tricked by Katari, an opponent of robots. Uran tries to escape with the captured Poppotore, but is caught by Katari and trapped inside the pterosaur.
14	"Micro's Big Adventure" / "Micro Adventure"; Transliteration: "Mikuro no daibōken" (Japanese: ミクロの大冒険)	Kazuo Yamazaki	Chiaki J. Konaka	Kazuo Yamazaki	July 13, 2003	April 1, 2004
A microbot infiltrates Uran's body. In order to eliminate it, Atom uses the explorer tank made by Dr. Minimini to create a small alter ego to enter Uran's body. However, Mini-Atom is unable to attack Uran's body because he does not want to damage it. In the meantime, the microbot begins to attack Uran's memories. Uran's memories are being destroyed one by one, and if this continues, her memory of Atom being her brother will also disappear, and not only Uran's electronic brain, but also Atom's electronic brain will be destroyed. At the same time, Minimini tries to take Atom's body, which is now an empty shell. In fact, the whole thing was set up by Minimini, and he, in the form of a scientist, had stolen Atom's body without the artificial brain to try and turn him into a weapon.
15	"Protect the Artificial Intelligence!" / "Only a Machine"; Transliteration: "Jinkōchinō o mamore!" (Japanese: 人工知能を守れ！)	Takao Suzuki	Pamela Hickey; Dennys McCoy	Masayoshi Nishida	July 20, 2003	April 5, 2004
Organics is a group that opposes robots with artificial intelligence. Kane, the leader of the group, uses the intelligence-depriving robot received from Skunk, Sakabot, to start depriving the robots of their artificial intelligence. Having lost their minds to make decisions, the robots become mere machines that repeat their basic programs, plunging the town into chaos. Kane is satisfied that the humans will now see the robots as dangerous, but it turns out that Skunk is just trying to make money. As Atom works to calm the confusion everywhere, the Sakabot begins to run amok, even stealing the intelligence of Kane's daughter Teffe and the villainous Skunk. Atom deliberately siphons off his own intelligence and infiltrates Sakabot, hoping to win back everyone's minds.
16	"Dark Robot Hunters" / "Robot Hunters"; Transliteration: "Yami no robotto hantā" (Japanese: 闇のロボットハンター)	Yukihiro Shino	Ai Ōta	Satoshi Kuwabara	July 27, 2003	March 25, 2004
A series of incidents occur in which robots are abducted by other robots. Atom and his robot squad, the robot cops, go to an artificial island in pursuit of the incidents. There, they find a huge underground robot dismantling factory. Skunk is controlling the robots and converting the abducted robots into weapons to sell. Atom's group enters the underground factory, but this was actually all part of Skunk's plan to bury Atom. The squadron and the robot hunters are all trapped underground in a high-voltage electromagnetic shield. Then the seawater comes pouring in. Atom and the other robots will get electrocuted if they are immersed in the electrified seawater. Atom desperately tries to convince the robot hunters that they are free and can decide what they want to do.
17	"Earth's Strongest Robot" / "The Rise of Pluto"; Transliteration: "Chijō saikyō no robotto" (Japanese: 地上最強のロボット)	Yukihiro Shino	Keiichi Hasegawa	Masayoshi Nishida	August 3, 2003	March 29, 2004
Robot Pluto was created for the sole purpose of fighting. His goal is to become the strongest robot in the world, and to achieve that, he challenges strong robots to battle and defeats them. His ultimate goal is to defeat Atom, but Dr. Tenma has set up the whole thing to test Atom's strength. Not wanting to fight, Atom asks Pluto why robots should fight each other. Although Atom's feelings were not understood by Pluto, who was only programmed to fight, his words raised a question in Pluto's mind about fighting. By chance, Pluto meets Uran, whose song makes something grow in his heart. Uran is afraid of Pluto, but gradually realizes that he really has a kind heart. However, Atom misunderstands that Pluto had hurt Uran, and the two finally decide to fight.
18	"Pluto is Undying" / "The Fall of Acheron"; Transliteration: "Purūtō wa shinazu" (Japanese: プルートウは死なず)	Yukihiro Shino	Keiichi Hasegawa	Masayoshi Nishida	August 10, 2003	March 30, 2004
When Uran tries to stop Atom and Pluto from fighting, she is attacked and injured. Atom, holding Uran in his arms, is completely defenseless. However, Pluto leaves Atom without attacking him. The feelings that had begun to grow in Pluto made him hesitate to attack. Still, Pluto had to complete his mission, so he continues to fight. Tenma kidnaps Dr. Ochanomizu to attract the attention of Atom, who tries to avoid the fight. At Brocken Volcano, and the battle of the century between Atom and Pluto finally begins. Pluto is supposed to be the stronger of the two, but he can't seem to settle the score, as the emotions in his heart are weakening his power. Shadow, the mysterious man who created Pluto, finally introduces Dark Pluto, a robot without a heart. Atom is hunted down by Dark Pluto, and gets into a desperate crisis.
19	"Robot Boy"; Transliteration: "Robotto bōi" (Japanese: ロボットボーイ)	Yukihiro Shino	Marc Handler	Yukihiro Shino	August 17, 2003	April 6, 2004
Atom's new friend, Tatsuo, is a boy who loves robots. He imagines that he is a robot by disguising himself as one, and builds robots out of junk. However, Tatsuo's mother, Erika, who is an excellent test pilot, does not find this amusing, and tells Tatsuo that fantasies and dreams are of no use. Erika's last day of flight arrives, and the dangerous test pilot job will be done by robots from then on. However, the rocket explodes upon launch. The recoil destroys the facility, and all hell breaks loose. Atom saves the people who were forced to flee. However, Erika is in the rocket. Tatsuo goes to the rocket alone to save his mother. In a daze, Erika remembers her old self.
20	"Eternal Boy" / "Eternal Children"; Transliteration: "Eien no shōnen" (Japanese: 永遠の少年)	Toshio Hirata	Hirotoshi Kobayashi	Satoshi Kuwabara	August 24, 2003	April 6, 2004
A case of children going missing occurs. One of them is Atom's friend Tamao and others. Atom and Tommy, a boy in a wheelchair who is also looking for his friends, go to find them. Their destination is Neverland. All the missing children had seen the Peter Pan play, and the two believe, just like in the story, that they had all been taken there. From the airship that appears in front of them, Atom hears Tamao's voice calling for help. This is the Neverland created by Darling, who hated adults and wanted to create eternal children. In Neverland, which is just like a fairyland, the mind-controlled children move forward to bask in a beam of light that will stop them from growing old. Realizing that they'll never grow up again if they go into the beam, Atom and Tommy join forces to try and stop the machine.
21	"Lake Monster" / "Dragon Lake"; Transliteration: "Mizuumi no kaibutsu" (Japanese: 湖の怪物)	Hiroshi Ishiodori	Keiichi Hasegawa	Satoshi Kuwabara	August 31, 2003	March 24, 2004
Yūko and Atom visit Dragon Lake, a legendary lake where dinosaurs are said to live, to investigate environmental destruction. Yūko and Sarah, a forest supervisor, go out to investigate and find evidence of illegal dumping, but it turns out that Sarah is the one who is responsible for the illegal dumping to make money. Yūko is captured by Sarah and her gang because of what she has found out. Meanwhile, Atom goes to the lake to investigate, and meets and becomes friends with Numata, a young man who is chasing dinosaurs in line with the wishes of his missing father. As Atom and Numata wander around in search of dinosaurs, they are met by Sarah's gang, who come to finish them off. A giant robot controlled by Sarah approaches them, but with Yūko taken hostage, Atom is unable to act.
22	"Goodbye Princess" / "The Legend of Tohron"; Transliteration: "Sayonara purinsesu" (Japanese: さよならプリンセス)	Yukio Suzuki	Ai Ōta	Yukio Suzuki	September 7, 2003	April 26, 2004
Kaya, Princess of the Kingdom of Mayura, suddenly jumps into the midst of Atom and his friends. She was being chased by Gedo and his men, who were trying to steal her "Tohron's Seal" in order to take over the kingdom of Mayura, when Reno rescued her and brought her here. Due to her status as a princess, Kaya is not allowed to walk freely in the city. Knowing this, Atom and his friends make Kaya wear a disguise and show her around the town. Reno gazes at Kaya, who seems to be enjoying her limited time away from being a princess, as if she is dazzling him. Kaya and Atom have a good time. However, they are finally discovered by Gedo's gang, and Reno is captured by Gedo in order to protect the princess and the seal. As the time to return home approaches, Kaya tries to save Reno with Atom and the others, refusing the requests to go home.
23	"Lost Memory" / "Lost in Outland"; Transliteration: "Ushinawareta kioku" (Japanese: 失われた記憶)	Kazuo Yamazaki	Hirotoshi Kobayashi	Kazuo Yamazaki	September 14, 2003	March 25, 2004
An obsolete artificial satellite, Ashura, goes out of its orbit and begins to fall toward the earth. Thanks to Atom's efforts, catastrophe is averted, but Atom, who was injured while dealing with Ashura, loses his memory and falls into a commune of hermits on the outskirts of Maple Town. At the same time in space, Ganymete, a satellite even bigger than Ashura, was slowly changing its orbit into the Earth's gravitational field. Atom was picked up and saved by a man named Boon, who had once gained fame by developing the all-purpose repair bot, the Boon Unit. Having lost his memory, Atom begins to live in a commune with Boon.
24	"Little Bears" / "The March of the Micro Bears"; Transliteration: "Bea-chan" (Japanese: ベアちゃん)	Yukio Suzuki	Keiichi Hasegawa	Yukio Suzuki	September 21, 2003	April 26, 2004
Kenichi's team won the championship thanks to Kenichi's goal. The crowd cheered and cheered, but only Atom looked upset. He knew it was a foul goal. Kenichi couldn't tell the others about the foul he had committed by accident. When Atom pointed it out to Kenichi, he misunderstood that Atom was blaming him. Then, a Micro Bear appears in front of Kenichi and begins to say comforting words one after another, and he is gradually drawn in by those words. This phenomenon spreads throughout the town. A large number of Micro Bears falls from the sky to charm people's hearts. Gradually, people begin to withdraw from the world with Micro Bears as their only friends. The truth is that those Bears were created by Shadow. Kenichi stopped coming to school with only Micro Bear as his friend. Atom desperately tries to talk to Kenichi in order to wake him up, but then, a giant Micro Bear appears.
25	"If I Could Shed a Tear" / "Deep City"; Transliteration: "Moshimo namida o nagasetara" (Japanese: もしも涙を流せたら)	Kazuo Yamazaki	Hirotoshi Kobayashi	Masayoshi Nishida	September 28, 2003	March 29, 2004
Dr. Ochanomizu and Atom visit the inauguration ceremony of Deep City. Deep City is an ideal city built underground to maintain the environment above ground. However, the city's designer, Dr. Sebastian, realizes that the environmental restoration system, which is essential for this underground city, is a forgery. If the city is allowed to continue operating, the pollution could spread from underground to the entire planet. Mayor Manny built this city for honor, but he couldn't spare the money for the environmental restoration system. Dr. Sebastian, who was locked up by Mayor Manny because he found out about it, sprays Chemical A, a plant growth formula, to stop the city from functioning and becoming a threat to the Earth. Trees start to grow abnormally and become like monsters attacking the city. Atom tries to save the people who are running for their lives, but his efforts are in vain as the trees continue to rampage. Atom must find away to stop the growth of the trees and save the people.
26	"Enter the Blue Knight" / "The Blue Knight"; Transliteration: "Aokishi tōjō" (Japanese: 青騎士登場)	Satoshi Kuwabara	Ai Ōta	Satoshi Kuwabara	October 5, 2003	April 6, 2004
Atom falls into the trap of Katari and his team, who are trying to eradicate robots, and is made to be the culprit who planted a wormhole projector on the airship Minerva. The wormhole projector is an unfinished matter transfer device, and once it is activated, the Minerva will be sent to the far reaches of space. Inside are many humans and Dr. Ochanomizu. Katari's gang is trying to make the Minerva disappear and blame it all on Atom and the other robots, which will spur the movement against robots. Atom wants to go and save Dr. Ochanomizu and the passengers, but is framed as the culprit, and his energy is drained and he is restrained.
27	"Higeoyaji, the Famous Detective" / "Old Dog, New Tricks"; Transliteration: "Meitantei Higeoyaji" (Japanese: 名探偵ヒゲオヤジ)	Yukio Suzuki	Keiichi Hasegawa	Yukio Suzuki	October 12, 2003	May 26, 2007
While searching for a kitten, detective Higeoyaji meets a boy named Sharaku in town who asks him to find his missing mother. The only clue is a mysterious sphere that Sharaku's mother gave him. In the meantime, Skunk has been committing crimes to steal the treasure from a secret room, using a daring method of announcing the crime. When Atom is asked to join the investigation, he meets Higeoyaji who is chasing Skunk, and somehow ends up working as his assistant. Through repeated trial and error, the duo of robot-hating Higeoyaji and robot Atom gradually get closer to the truth. What seems to be a locked-room crime is actually a crime committed using Gadem, a special magnetic robot that can be freely assembled. And it was Sharaku's mother who discovered the mechanism of Gadem. In order to save Sharaku's mother and capture Skunk, Atom and Higeoyaji confront the Skunk-controlled magnetic robot Gadem.
28	"Space Plant Crisis" / "Hydra-Jacked"; Transliteration: "Uchū puranto no kiki" (Japanese: 宇宙プラントの危機)	Fumihiro Yoshimura	Ai Ōta	Satoshi Kuwabara	October 19, 2003	March 30, 2004
Hydra, a space plant run solely by robots, has been continuously producing high quality energy with its superior technology and capabilities. While visiting the plant, the president of Gazette Technology Development, Gazette, and his colleague plan to steal the technology by hacking and manipulating the plant's computer. However, this leads to an unexpected situation. The computer goes out of control and all the machines start to explode. Surprised, Gazette activates the emergency destruction system and flees the plant, blaming the robots for the problem. The robots are trapped in the plant which will explode in 10 minutes. When Dr. Ochanomizu hears the news, he tries to send a rescue team, but is rebuffed coldly and told, "Not for robots." At the plant, the robots are waiting for the rescue team, believing in their arrival. Atom goes to the plant alone to save the robots.
29	"Uran and the Famous Detective" / "The Case of the Phantom Fowl"; Transliteration: "Uran to meitantei" (Japanese: ウランと名探偵)	Masami Hata	Keiichi Hasegawa	Takuo Suzuki	October 26, 2003	June 2, 2007
Uran is always being compared to her older brother, Atom, and is not amused. Then, Uran hears a rumor about a bird-like ghost that appears in the tunnels every night. In order to make herself look good, she declares that she will eliminate the ghost, and sets out to find it. There, she meets a detective named Higeoyaji who was looking for a missing duckling. The two hit it off and head out together to exterminate the ghost, only to be confronted by a terrifying figure. At the same time, Atom is investigating the illegal dumping of robots, when he learns a horrifying fact: toxic substances dumped in another dimension will warp space-time and cause it to collapse. Meanwhile, Uran and Higeoyaji run away after seeing the terrifying ghost, but then Uran hears the ghost's voice. It appears these two incidents, which seemed so disparate, actually have a great connection.
30	"Underground Exploration" / "Geo-Raider"; Transliteration: "Chitei tanken" (Japanese: 地底探検)	Shigeharu Takahashi	Hirotoshi Kobayashi	Masayoshi Nishida	November 2, 2003	March 30, 2004
It has been decided that the Core Raider, a subterranean exploration machine, will be used to explore a huge cavern. In order to back up the system, Atom is hurriedly sent along for the ride. Damon, the captain of the team, is not happy about it. Damon, who says he'll listen to Atom but make the decisions himself, has a strong antipathy toward the robot. Damon does not heed Atom's advice and continues to cut through the dangerous bedrocks. They finally reach the giant cave, avoiding several crises. It is a different world with an unknown ecosystem. Alcard, the sponsor, finds a valuable resource there, the Extra Crystals, and his attitude changes. But the Extra Crystals have a life of their own. They assume a battle formation and surround the members of the expedition. At the same time, giant insect-like monsters attack them.
31	"Goonon's Big Adventure" / "Gideon"; Transliteration: "Gūnon no daibōken" (Japanese: グーノンの大冒険)	Takechika Narikawa	Ai Ōta	Toshio Hirata	November 9, 2003	June 9, 2007
Cameron Strait is a mysterious sea area where many ships have been disappearing since long ago. There is a legend that a "white monster" lives there. The first deep-sea investigation robot developed by Reno, Goonon, heads into the deep sea with Atom and his friends to solve the mystery. However, the cowardly Goonon gets frightened at the slightest thing and runs away in a hurry. In fact, Reno made Goonon that way on purpose to make it easier to sense the dangers of the sea. Goonon is depressed and calls himself a coward, but Atom and Reno believe that Goonon will overcome his weaknesses. They find a ship graveyard in the deep sea. Dr. Poppotore, who had come to lead Atom and his friends, goes to search for the treasure that is said to be hidden there. That's when Goonon senses something. He sensed the presence of something huge coming from the ocean floor. That was the "White Monster."
32	"Secret of the Blue Knight"; Transliteration: "Aokishi no himitsu" (Japanese: 青騎士の秘密)	Yukio Suzuki	Keiichi Hasegawa	Masayoshi Nishida	November 16, 2003	March 30, 2004
In outer space, Robot Crush, where robots fight each other, is secretly held as a spectacle for humans. When the Blue Knight arrives at the site of the black market for robots to be used in this event, he meets Hamegg, the organizer of Robot Crush, and remembers what he used to be. He had thought that he had been created by Shadow, but in fact he was Blue Bon, a repair robot for Robot Crush. Having seen robots destroyed in battle, repaired, destroyed again, and eventually discarded, the old Blue Knight resisted Hamegg's unfair treatment of robots and tried to free them, only to be thrown into space, where he was picked up by Shadow and reborn. The Blue Knight heads to the black market again. Atom was also on his way to the site to capture Hamegg. However, three robots appear there.
33	"Fairy Tale"; Transliteration: "Yōsei monogatari" (Japanese: 妖精物語)	Yoshio Takeuchi	Hirotoshi Kobayashi	Yoshio Takeuchi	November 23, 2003	June 16, 2007
Nina's father is busy with his work, and she doesn't get much attention from him. That day was Nina's birthday. Surrounded by a mountain of presents, Nina threw them against the wall. She wanted her dad to be there more than she wanted presents. In order to comfort Nina, Friday, the story teller robot, goes on a "fairy hunt," which Nina said she wants to meet, and meets Atom and his friends, who end up helping Friday hunt for the fairies. In the meantime, Nina's dad is trying to make her wish come true, when he is approached by someone to make a machine that can visualize the images in her mind. However, it was Dr. Minimini, who had escaped from prison, who brought the idea to him. The images in people's minds flood the city, and all hell breaks loose. Dr. Minimini then exploits the machine and starts committing robberies one after another.
34	"Shape-Shifting Lifeform Moopie" / "Shape Shifter"; Transliteration: "Henkei seimei mūpī" (Japanese: 変形生命ムーピー)	Yoshizō Tsuda	Sadayuki Murai	Hiromitsu Morita	November 30, 2003	June 23, 2007
A series of incidents occur in which the Lunalights, stones with mysterious powers that came from distant space, are stolen. Animals such as snakes and wolves have been seen at the scene. As Atom tries to solve the case, he is shot and injured by someone while chasing the culprit. However, he is saved by a beautiful woman named Tamami. But Tamami is actually a creature from outer space called the Moopie that can change its shape at will, and is the culprit behind the theft of the Lunalights. It was controlled by Rock, a genius criminal with supernatural powers. Tamami had no choice but to do Rock's bidding in order to save her benefactor, Dr. Saruta. Rock's goal is to use the Lunalights to summon a mysterious flying object that will evolve humans into super humans, and turn himself into a super human. But to do so, he needs to have a strong mind that could take in the tremendous energy. Rock plans to make Atom play this role, and uses Tamami as a hostage to ask for Atom's cooperation.
35	"Atom vs. Rock" / "Firebird"; Transliteration: "Atomu vs Rokku" (Japanese: アトムvsロック)	Yasumi Mikamoto	Sadayuki Murai	Hiromitsu Morita	December 7, 2003	June 30, 2007
While wandering in the space-time labyrinth, Rock is saved by the Firebird and returns to Earth. The Firebird is trying to see how Rock would use his power. After returning to Phoenix Island, where ancient ruins lie, Rock uses his supernatural powers to manipulate Dr. Lyon, a scholar who lives on the island, to bring Atom and Dr. Ochanomizu to the island under the pretense that they are there for research. Unaware of this, Atom and Ochanomizu arrive on the island. They go to investigate the ruins with Professor Atami, but he suddenly locks Dr. Ochanomizu in an ancient prison. Atami is a disguised version of Rock. In order to become a super human again, Rock uses Atom. In order to save Dr. Ochanomizu, Atom has no choice but to do as he is told. Finally, the door to become a super human appears in front of Rock.
36	"Robot in Love" / "Space Academy"; Transliteration: "Koisuru robotto" (Japanese: 恋するロボット)	Kazuo Yamazaki	Hirotoshi Kobayashi	Kazuo Yamazaki	December 14, 2003	July 7, 2007
In order to design a space rocket, Horus 2, Atom arrives at Space Camp, a campus for students who want to pursue space exploration. There, Atom meets a student named Roxanne. As soon as he meets Roxanne, Atom begins to change. His body temperature rises and his voice sounds shrill. This phenomenon is similar to the symptoms of a person in love. In other words, Atom seems to have fallen in love with Roxanne. His roommate, Anton, who is also in love with Roxanne, asks Atom to help him bridge the gap. Listening to Anton's request, Atom writes a letter to Roxanne on his behalf, and expresses love in a way that describes exactly what Atom is feeling for her. Roxanne is moved by the letter and shows interest in Anton. She is chosen to be a crew member of Horus 2 and to celebrate, Anton takes Roxanne to it. At that moment, Horus 2 suddenly starts to activate. At this rate, it will crash into the moon. Atom rushes after them.
37	"Atlas Strikes Back"; Transliteration: "Atorasu gyakushū" (Japanese: アトラス逆襲)	Kazuhiro Furuhashi	Keiichi Hasegawa	Masayoshi Nishida	December 21, 2003	July 14, 2007
The wreckage of Atlas, which was wandering in space, was recovered by a crooked dealer and passed on to Dr. Pavlos, the former deputy director of the Ministry of Science. Dr. Pavlos implants an omegachip, which can be used to control robots, into Atlas's head and turns him into a violent robot. Atlas is going out of control, and the only way to stop him is to destroy him. Dr. Pavlos's goal is to implant the omegachip in every robot in the world and make them do what he wants. Of course, Atom is no exception. Atom is under attack by Atlas. Unable to destroy Atlas, Atom finally runs out of power and ends up in Dr. Pavlos's hands. Atom is determined to resist. However, Atlas, under Dr. Pavlos's orders, attacks Atom, and he is in desperate straits.
38	"Emily's Wish" / "Battle-Bot"; Transliteration: "Emirī no negai" (Japanese: エミリーの願い)	Makoto Fuchigami	Marc Handler	Masayoshi Nishida	December 28, 2003	July 21, 2007
Emily and her parents, a family of robots that were made to test human life in a space environment, live happily and lovingly with each other just like a real family. However, their dome is attacked by the Space Raiders. The Space Raiders, led by an anti-robot group, intend to take out the artificial brains of the robots and make them work as mere manual laborers. Emily's parents, who were defending her, are captured by the Space Raiders. In order to get them back by herself, Emily asks the Blue Knight to convert her into a fighting robot. Atom is against it, but Emily pushes past his objections and finally becomes one. Atom, Emily and the others face off against the Space Raiders to get her parents back.
39	"Time Hunters"; Transliteration: "Taimu hantā" (Japanese: タイムハンター)	Yoshio Takeuchi	Larry Bischof	Hiromitsu Morita	January 11, 2004	July 28, 2007
Hunters from the future world collect superior animals in order to genetically manipulate them to create stronger creatures. After collecting the nearly extinct cheetah, the hunters now head to a world 10,000 years in the past to collect the mammoth. Atom and Uran get caught up in the hunt and are both transported 10,000 years back in time. The scenery of 10,000 years ago spreads before their eyes. Uran, who arrived there before Atom, is surrounded by hyenas and is in danger, but then a primitive boy appears and saves her. The boy doesn't speak their language, but Atom and Uran gradually get along with him, and a timeless friendship grows between the three of them. At the same time, the hunters continue mammoth hunting, taking along fellow monsters, Cyclops and Web. When Atom hears the sad cries of a baby mammoth, he sets out to rescue them.
40	"Robot Hatred" / "Escape from Volcano Island"; Transliteration: "Robotto-girai" (Japanese: ロボット嫌い)	Satoshi Kuwabara	Keiichi Hasegawa	Satoshi Kuwabara	January 18, 2004	August 4, 2007
An event to decide the "Best Robot of the Year," which is given to the robot that has been most active throughout the year, is held on the luxury cruise ship "Queen Cosmo." Atom is chosen as one of the winners, and he and Dr. Ochanomizu are enjoying their trip on the luxury liner. However, there is a person who is trying to ruin the event. It was the robot-hating Lamp, who is trying to sink the Queen Cosmo by artificially exploding a volcano. Lamp has an obsessive hatred for robots, but in the back of his mind, there is an image of a robot that has never disappeared. It was a robot named Friend, who had saved his life a long time ago. Unaware of Lamp's ruse, the Queen Cosmo heads for a volcanic island. In fact, the volcanic island is the place where Lamp and Friend spent their time together.
41	"Memories of a Giant" / "Avalanche"; Transliteration: "Kyojin no kioku" (Japanese: 巨人の記憶)	Kentarō Mizuno	Ai Ōta	Tomomi Mochizuki	January 25, 2004	August 11, 2007
A giant monster has been spotted in the "Snowfield in the Sky" on Mount Herve. Atom joins the search party for the monster, but Dr. Ochanomizu tells Atom that it is not a monster at all, but a robot that disappeared 12 years ago. Back then, the Chronos Project was being carried out in the Snowfield in the Sky, using the giant plasma wave telescope Merchiades to observe the universe. However, in a mysterious accident that appears to be an avalanche, everything was buried under the snow. The giant monster could be the robot that went missing at that time. The robot had a deep connection with Yūko, the secretary of Ochanomizu. She asks to be allowed to take part in the search. Atom and Yūko join the search party and finally find the missing robot. She speaks to the robot and calls him Gulliver, but Gulliver has lost his memory.
42	"Battle of Steel Island"; Transliteration: "Kōtetsu-jima no tatakai" (Japanese: 鋼鉄島の戦い)	Yoshizō Tsuda	Keiichi Hasegawa	Fumihiro Yoshimura	February 1, 2004	August 18, 2007
The Blue Knight continues to attack humans in order to help robots that are treated unfairly by humans. Atom is worried that the existence of the Blue Knight will destroy the relationship between humans and robots. At that time, Atom learns that the anti-robotist, Lamp, has set out for Steel Island, an artificial island in the Pacific Ocean, in an attempt to exterminate the Blue Knight and the robots he has protected. The person who seduced him was Tenma, and he is in possession of a powerful weapon created by Dr. Tenma. Atom heads for Steel Island, but the battle has already begun and the island is in a state of chaos. Lamp is determined to exterminate the robots. The Blue Knight even tries to kill the humans he hates. In between the two, Atom tries to save both humans and robots. However, Lamp has set off a bomb that will annihilate the robots, and has grabbed the switch. If he is not killed, the robots will be wiped out.
43	"The Robot That Yearned to Be Human" / "Undercover"; Transliteration: "Ningen ni akogareta robotto" (Japanese: 人間に憧れたロボット)	Kazuo Yamazaki	Ai Ōta	Kazuo Yamazaki	February 8, 2004	August 25, 2007
Klaus, a robot made to look like a human for undercover work, removes the transmitter attached to him and runs away. However, the robot is infected with a virus that automatically renders it incapable of functioning when the transmitter is removed. With the virus vaccine in hand, Atom and Delta pursue Klaus. They learn that Klaus's memory will soon be erased and he is scheduled to be renewed. As he lives as a human, Klaus awakens to human feelings and yearns to be human. It is not known where he is going before he loses his memory. Atom then learns that there is a song that Klaus deeply loved. Klaus had run away to listen to that song. If Atom doesn't find Klaus soon, he won't be able to get the vaccine in time. But Cutter, who is not happy with Klaus, pursues Atom to stop him.
44	"To the Dragon Forest" / "Into the Dragon's Lair"; Transliteration: "Ryū no mori e" (Japanese: 龍の森へ)	Saburō Hashimoto	Ai Ōta	Toshio Hirata	February 15, 2004	September 1, 2007
At the invitation of Princess Kaya, Atom and his friends visit the Kingdom of Mayura. It is a wonderful land full of nature. Atom and his friends are happy to be reunited with Princess Kara and have a good time in the kingdom. However, Princess Kaya is not in good spirits. When they ask her why, she tells them that the robots have hardly spoken to humans since about a month ago. The robots have been living in the kingdom of Mayura for a year now. Naturally, Kaya and the humans have always loved the robots as if they were their friends. However, she was worried that the robots might not like living in the kingdom. Then, Atom and his friends hear a rumor that a dragon has been seen in the forest of Tohron. They wonder if it has something to do with the fact that the robots are no longer talking to humans. Atom and his friends go to the Tohron Forest to find out the truth about the robots' minds.
45	"The Night Before the Revolution"; Transliteration: "Kakumei zen'ya" (Japanese: 革命前夜)	Fumihiro Yoshimura	Ai Ōta	Fumihiro Yoshimura	February 22, 2004	September 8, 2007
A young girl named Ena loves Kipp, a GP IV robot with a kind heart. However, her father, Red, is not happy to see the robot and his daughter getting along so well, and decides to kick Kipp out of the house. When Ena finds out about this and goes to protest to her father, she falls down the stairs in a panic. The butler, who witnesses this, mistakenly thinks that Kipp has pushed her down the stairs and reports this to everyone. The news that "a robot who knew he was going to be kicked out of his house pushed the daughter down the stairs out of revenge" spreads quickly, and it terrifies the people. Ena, who knows the truth, lies unconscious in her sleep. Finally, it was decided that all GP IV robots would be dismantled. The squadron has to drag away their fellow robots, and Atom wants to save them somehow. Then, the Blue Knight appears. The Blue Knight rescues the GP IVs from being taken away for dismantling and declares that from now on, he is done with humans.
46	"The Founding of Robotania" / "Robotania"; Transliteration: "Robotania kenkoku" (Japanese: ロボタニア建国)	Takao Suzuki	Keiichi Hasegawa	Masayoshi Nishida	February 29, 2004	September 15, 2007
The Blue Knight, who has parted ways with the humans, and the robots who have followed him, gather in Antarctica. There, the Blue Knight declares that this place will be named Robotania. When the humans learned of this, they misunderstood that the robots had rebelled against the humans, and began to look at Atom with fear. Finally, a decision is made to dismantle all the AI robots, including Atom. Ochanomizu, who opposes the decision, is considered an enemy of humanity. Inspector Tawashi has no choice but to capture Atom and the other robots because of the orders issued to him, but Ochanomizu secretly lets Atom go. He entrusts everything to Atom, saying that he is the only one who can go to Antarctica to meet the Blue Knight and save the future of robots and humans. When Ena finally regains consciousness, she is baffled by the fact that she was supposedly thrown down the stairs by Kipp, and by the commotion that followed.
47	"Decisive Battle of Antarctica!" / "Showdown at Robotania"; Transliteration: "Kessen! Nankyokutairiku" (Japanese: 決戦！南極大陸)	Atsushi Takizawa	Keiichi Hasegawa	Masayoshi Nishida	March 7, 2004	September 22, 2007
In order to subdue the robots, the Ulysses crew, led by Duke Red, headed for Robotania. Ena and Reno are chasing after them, and Ena is trying to tell her father, Duke Red, that Kipp didn't hurt her, and to stop the attack. On the other hand, Atom goes to Robotania to stop the battle, but he runs out of energy and falls into a crevasse, getting hurt. The person who saved him was Dr. Tenma. He orders Atom to "break away from humans and become the king of robots" and tries to give him a new body. Atom shakes him off and flies away. In the town, AI robots, including Uran, are about to be dismantled, and the battle between humans and robots rages on in Robotania. Finally, Duke Red activates a satellite beam cannon that will obliterate Robotania in an instant.
48	"Journey to Tomorrow"; Transliteration: "Ashita e no tabidachi" (Japanese: 明日への旅立ち)	Masayoshi Nishida	Keiichi Hasegawa	Masayoshi Nishida	March 14, 2004	September 29, 2007
Thanks to the efforts of Atom and the Blue Knight, the annihilation of Robotania by the satellite beam cannon is avoided, but the hatred that has been born between robots and humans only intensifies. In the midst of all this, Ena finally reaches Duke Red, telling him that the events that led to the battle were a misunderstanding. In the town, Inspector Tawashi and his team discover that the film evidence of the robot rebellion was fabricated by the robot opposition. The facts gradually come to light. However, there is no way to erase the hatred that has been created during this battle, and it seems impossible to stop the fight. Ochanomizu tells Atom that the only person who can end this battle is him. Atom heads for the Blue Knight with a desperate resolve, in order to persuade him and stop the fight, and in order to revive the friendship between humans and robots.
49	"Atom Reborn" / "Astro Reborn"; Transliteration: "Atomu fukkatsu" (Japanese: アトム復活)	Kazuo Yamazaki	Keiichi Hasegawa	Kazuo Yamazaki	March 21, 2004	October 6, 2007
Atom's desperate hopes helped restore the relationship between humans and robots. However, Atom, who went towards the missile to save the robots, never regains consciousness. Ochanomizu continues to desperately repair the robot, wondering if Atom will ever wake up again. All over the world, people and robots are hoping for Atom's revival. Then, an unexpected person comes to Ochanomizu's door. It was Tenma. Ochanomizu entrusts his last hope for Atom's revival to Tenma, who says he is the only one who can fix Atom. One month later, Dr. Ochanomizu and the others are overjoyed to receive the news that Atom has been revived, but when Atom sees Ochanomizu, he asks him who he is. Atom's memories had been rewritten by Dr. Tenma, and he believes that he is a human and that Dr. Tenma is his real father. Meanwhile, Lamp is after Atom and Tenma.
50	"The Final Battle"; Transliteration: "Saigo no taiketsu" (Japanese: 最後の対決)	Keiichirō Mochizuki	Keiichi Hasegawa	Kazuya Konaka; Keiichirō Mochizuki; Shinji Seya	March 28, 2004	October 13, 2007
Atom's memories come back to life and he returns to Ochanomizu, but Tenma persistently pursues him. Finally, he decides to take aggressive measures. He uses a robot dog to take over the Ministry of Science. Having taken over the Ministry, Tenma has one request: to talk to Atom alone. In Tenma's hand is a bomb that will blow up the Ministry. Alone at the Ministry, Atom finally confronts Tenma. The location is Plant 7. For Tenma, it was the place where he had a history with his son Tobio. Gradually, the secret of why Tenma abandoned Atom, whom he created in place of his son, is uncovered, along with Tenma's sorrow and despair. In a fit of insanity, Tenma reveals everything, raises the temperature of the blast furnace, and tries to end the life of the Ministry of Science as well. At Plant 7, which is on the verge of exploding, Tenma tells Atom to go. Atom is forced to make a bitter choice.

== Home releases ==
(USA, Region 1/A)
Volume	Episodes	Release date	Ref.
1	1-10	August 18, 2009	
2	11-20	August 18, 2009	
3	21-30	August 18, 2009	
4	31-40	August 18, 2009	
5	41-50	August 18, 2009	
The Complete Series	1-50	March 29, 2005	
The Complete Series	1-50	May 5, 2015	
The Complete Series	1-50	May 2, 2019	
Pop Culture Bento Box	1-4	February 5, 2019	
