= Astro Boy: Omega Factor =

2003 video game

- Developers: Treasure; Hitmaker
- Publisher: Sega: EU: THQ
- Director: Tetsu Okano
- Producer: Mie Kumagai
- Designer: Mitsuru Yaida
- Programmer: Mitsuru Yaida
- Writer: Tetsu Okano
- Composers: Norio Hanzawa; Tsuyoshi Kaneko
- Platform: Game Boy Advance
- Release: JP: December 18, 2003; NA: August 17, 2004; EU: February 18, 2005
- Genre: Beat 'em up
- Mode: Single-player

Astro Boy: Omega Factor (Note: Known in Japan as Astro Boy: Tetsuwan Atomu (Japanese: アストロボーイ・鉄腕アトム). The packaging gives a subtitle of Atom Heart no Himitsu (Japanese: アトムハートの秘密).) is a beat 'em up video game developed by Treasure and Hitmaker, and published by Sega (THQ in Europe). The game was released for the Game Boy Advance on December 18, 2003, in Japan; August 17, 2004, in North America; and February 18, 2005, in Europe. The game is based on Osamu Tezuka's manga and anime franchise Astro Boy. However, it also features characters and plotlines from the artist's entire canon of work.

While Astro Boy had been well known for decades in Japan, the North American release was delayed to coincide with the premiere of the Astro Boy TV series in 2004. During this delay, Treasure made some game improvements to the North American version of the game. The game received positive reviews from critics, with strong praise focused on the game's visuals, and limited criticism on level design. In 2010, the game was included as one of the titles in the book 1001 Video Games You Must Play Before You Die.

== Gameplay ==
Astro defeats aerial enemies

Omega Factor is a beat 'em up game starring Astro Boy, who must travel through stages to defeat enemies. Astro can punch and kick away enemies, as well as fire at them with a laser. Doing damage to the enemies will slowly fill the EX gauge at the top of the screen. Once the gauge is filled, Astro is able to perform a special attack, including a high-power laser, charging into the enemies, or guns that deal damage to every enemy on screen. Astro is also able to fly using rocket power, which is also sometimes necessary.

Every non-player character the player meets gets added to the titular Omega Factor, the representation of Astro's soul. Some characters grant a point that can be used to improve one of Astro's stats, such as health, strength or flight speed, as well as allowing the player to find hidden areas in levels. The game features two difficulty levels in the Japanese version, and three in the North American and European versions.

== Synopsis ==
=== Setting and characters ===
Omega Factor features elements from Astro Boy's different incarnations. The concept of robot rights, Dr. Tenma's ultimate plan for Astro and the robot city of Robotonia in Antarctica are lifted from the Astro Boy 2003 TV series. Plotlines from other Tezuka series include a time travel plot lifted from Marine Express, a journey to the lost continent of Mu, and a subplot involving Duke Red's daughter and her role in the "Death Mask" orbital platform. The game is divided into two episodes: Birth and Rebirth. The Birth episode follows Astro's adventures and other characters he interacts with, and ends with robots being destroyed by a device called Death Mask, after it determines that the robots are too dangerous to be left alive, leaving Sharaku able to conquer the Earth. In Rebirth, Astro is revived by a being called Phoenix, and has Astro go back to the beginning of the story and try to stop the Death Mask, giving him the ability to go back and forward in time to do so.

The story includes characters from Tezuka's entire canon of work. The characters are listed in the "Omega Factor", an in-game encyclopedia of the Astro Boy fictional universe, which provides a detailed character biography, including each character's appearances and roles in Tezuka's works.

=== Plot ===
In the year 2146, Dr. Tenma loses his son Tobio in a car accident and rebuilds him as the robot hero Astro Boy. Guided by Dr. O'Shay, Astro learns about his powers and quickly becomes involved in a series of conflicts involving rogue robots, criminals, and powerful enemies such as Atlas. During his adventures, Astro uncovers conspiracies stretching from Metro City to Antarctica and even the lost continent of Mu. He encounters many allies and rivals, including Pook, Duke Red, Rag, and Nuka, while battling threats such as the Black Looks organization and the mysterious Sharaku. After being transported thousands of years into the past, Astro returns to a future devastated by war between humans and robots. There he confronts Sharaku, who escapes before the deadly Death Mask causes Astro's destruction.

Astro is revived by the Phoenix and gains the ability to travel through time, allowing him to alter events and seek a better future. In the new timeline, political struggles, robot uprisings, and hidden truths about Death Mask reshape the world. Astro discovers that Nuka was made into Death Mask, while Sharaku has manipulated many events from behind the scenes. With help from allies such as Atlas, Wally, Rainbow Parakeet, and Dr. Black Jack, Astro uncovers the origins of the conflict and works to prevent global catastrophe. In the final battle, Sharaku uses the living substance Omotanium to create the giant Garon, but Astro defeats the threat and sacrifices part of himself and Nuka to stop a massive explosion. The Phoenix restores them both, bringing peace and hope for the future, although Sharaku survives but is eventually subdued when Wato seals away his powers.

== Development and release ==
Astro Boy: Omega Factor was co-developed for the GBA by Treasure and Hitmaker produced as part of a collaboration between game publisher Sega and Tezuka Productions. After a suggestion by Hitmaker president Mie Kumagai, Sega acquired the rights to create games based on the characters of manga artist Osamu Tezuka around the time the 2003 Astro Boy TV series started production to celebrate the in-universe birthday of April 7, 2003, of the titular character. This would also coincide with the 40th anniversary of the 1963 Astro Boy anime adaptation. Omega Factor was developed in conjunction with Astro Boy on the PlayStation 2 from Sonic Team. After learning that this latter title would have 3D graphics, Kumagai signed on as video game producer of Omega Factor and proposed that it be a 2D side-scroller because its director, Tetsu "Tez" Okano, was very knowledgeable about this style of game and animation. As a long-time fan of Treasure's action games on the Sega Genesis, Okano was eager to involve the studio in the project and replicate the feeling and tone of these earlier releases.

Okano claimed that the development schedule was tight and that the staff consisted of about ten individuals. He took on the responsibility of overall direction including rough specs, stage structures, and narrative writing while Treasure focused on other aspects. Although its graphics matched the art style of the 2003 series, Okano took some liberties with regards the plot. As a self-proclaimed Tezuka fanatic, the director wished to "balance a different kind of consistency, between the black and white and the color". This meant introducing new story elements while maintaining what he thought late Astro Boy author Osamu Tezuka would have wanted. The inclusion of 47 characters from Tezuka's other manga titles was an homage to the mangaka penchant for having recurring characters throughout his works. Okano intended the main theme to be Astro Boy cultivating the human side of his heart by meeting these other characters and accumulating impressions.

Omega Factor was chiefly designed and programmed by Mitsuru Yaida, who notably worked on Treasure's run and gun shooter Gunstar Heroes. Yaida explained that because Omega Factor only had one playable character, they wished to give the player freedom of movement and emphasized the dash mechanic to give the controls more variety. He admitted that he and Okano did not get along in the planning phase of the game. Whereas Yaida wanted to program specifications like points, times, and high scores as development progressed, Yaida wanted them implemented at the start. Yaida said they were added early to satisfy the director but that it was difficult to make them "meaningful" towards the end of production. Due to the GBA's limited RAM and video RAM, he said it was also challenging to program a mechanic which allowed switching between gameplay and menu screens while maintaining event and status displays. Okano said that Omega Factor ultimately played most like Gunstar Heroes but recognized similarities with Treasure's Alien Soldier, including how that game's composer, Norio Hanzawa, also contributed to Omega Factor's soundtrack. The developers added references from these two games for Treasure fans.

Omega Factor was released in Japan on December 18, 2003. Sega waited until the overseas premiere of the new TV series before releasing the game outside Japan. During this six-month wait, the developers took the opportunity to rework some aspects for the localized version. Some level layouts were filled with more enemies, certain enemies were given different attacks, frame rate slowdown was improved, and a new third difficulty setting was added. Sega released Omega Factor in North America on August 17, 2004, while THQ published it in Europe on February 18, 2005.

== Reception ==
Reception

Aggregate scores
Aggregator	Score
GameRankings	86.72%
Metacritic	85/100

Review scores
Publication	Score
1Up.com	A−
Edge	8/10
Electronic Gaming Monthly	8.5/10, 9/10, 8.5/10
Famitsu	34/40
Game Informer	8.5/10
GamePro	4.5/5
GameSpot	9.2/10
GameSpy	4.5/5
GameZone	8.5/10
IGN	8.8/10
Nintendo Power	4.5/5
X-Play	4/5

Omega Factor received positive reviews, with aggregate scores of 85 out of 100 from Metacritic and 86.72% from GameRankings. GameSpot's Frank Provo stated that "[e]veryone, regardless of age, simply must own and play Astro Boy: Omega Factor – because it is one of the best action games on the Game Boy Advance." The publication named it the best Game Boy Advance game of August 2004, and later of the year overall. GameSpy writer Benjamin Turner likewise listed it as one of the best Game Boy Advance games of the year.

The game was highly praised for its visuals. Provo called the game, overall, "a delight for the senses," and praised the detail and lavish animation of the background and character sprites. Geoffrey Winter of Nintendojo stated that the environments are "beautiful and look as if they were built to be admired, not just walked through." He went on to say that Omega Factor has more seductively detailed visuals than any other Game Boy Advance game. IGN's Craig Harris called it a "technical marvel," especially praising the fluid animation of the bosses, and reserving criticism for the game's occasional framerate slowdown. The New York Times' Charles Herold called it a "memorable experience".

The few instances of criticism the game received were mainly directed at the repetitiveness of the levels. Turner listed this repetitiveness, specifically for the shooter stages, as one of the game's "cons." Harris stated that some of the levels "are the absolute pits and feel completely out of place because of their slapped-together feel." 1UP.com's Sam Kennedy stated that the levels are "more of a formality than anything – you casually battle a set of enemies until you reach a boss, which is where the real gameplay begins."

Nintendo Power named this their 38th best game of all time in their final issue, saying that it "captures the essence of Astro Boy perfectly and melds it with developer Treasure's trademark brand of pulse-pounding action." In 2013, Game Informer listed Omega Factor as one of the "Best Anime and Manga-Based Games" released in English.
