= Astro Boy (2003 TV series) =

2003 anime television series

- Cover of the first DVD volume
- アストロボーイ・鉄腕アトム
- Genre: Adventure; Superhero
- Based on: Astro Boy by Osamu Tezuka
- Developed by: Marc Handler
- Directed by: Kazuya Konaka
- Voices of: Makoto Tsumura; Hisashi Katsuta; Miki Maruyama; Akiko Kawase; Naoki Tatsuta
- Music by: Takashi Yoshimatsu
- Country of origin: Japan
- Original language: Japanese
- No. of episodes: 50 (list of episodes)

Production
- Executive producers: Takayuki Matsutani; Haruyuki Machida; Ryuichi Mori
- Producers: Minoru Kubota; Yasuhisa Kazama; Norio Hayashi; Kaoru Matsuzaki; Atsuya Takase; Tsuneyuki Morishima
- Production companies: Sony Pictures Entertainment Japan; Tezuka Productions; Dentsu; Fuji Television
- Budget: $250,000+ (per episode)

Original release
- Network: Fuji Television
- Release: April 6, 2003 – March 28, 2004

Related
- Mighty Atom (1959 tokusatsu series); Astro Boy (1963 TV series); Astro Boy (1980 TV series); Astro Boy (film)

Astro Boy (アストロボーイ・鉄腕アトム, Asutoro Bōi: Tetsuwan Atomu; lit. 'Astro Boy: Mighty Atom') is a Japanese anime television series, based on Osamu Tezuka's manga series of the same name. Produced by Tezuka Productions in collaboration with Sony Pictures Entertainment Japan and Animax, it was directed by Kazuya Konaka, with Marc Handler as the story editor, Shinji Seya designing the characters, Shinji Aramaki and Takeshi Takakura designing the mechanical elements, Keiichirō Mochizuki serving as chief animation director, and Takashi Yoshimatsu composing the music.

The anime was created to celebrate the birthdate of Atom/Astro Boy, as well as the 40th anniversary of the original TV series. It kept the same classic art style as the original manga and anime, but was renewed and modernized with more lush, high-quality, near-theatrical animation and visuals, combining the playfulness of the early anime with the darker, more serious and dramatic science fiction themes of the manga and the 1980 series. The anime was broadcast in Japan on Animax and Fuji TV from April 6, 2003, to March 28, 2004, every Sunday from 9:30 to 10:00 JST, for a total of 50 episodes, and it was also aired outside of Japan on Kids' WB in the United States and other local broadcasters overseas.

== Synopsis ==
The show is set in the futuristic year of 2003, where a variety of robots have been developed around the world and have begun working at the humans' beck and call, but are nothing more than machines that move on command. In the midst of this, in Metro City, the renowned Dr. Tenma disappears after trying to construct an AI robot with a "heart." Professor Ochanomizu replaces Tenma as head of the Ministry of Science and discovers a boy-like robot and brings it to life and names him Atom (Astro). He soon discovers he can fly via rocket boosters in his hands and feet, and has superhuman strength and other such abilities, and must deal with robots and villainous robot-hating humans who threaten his friends, fellow robots and Metro City, becoming a hero in the process. Atom quickly learns he is a robotic duplicate of Dr. Tenma's dead son Tobio Tenma, and was shut down after seeing how discarded robots were dealt with by his father, an incident similar to what Tobio experienced before dying.

A new arc occurs with the introduction of the Blue Knight, a gallant robot who starts a campaign to free all robots from mankind. Another recurring character, Acetylene Lamp, goes slowly paranoid about the destruction of all robots and becomes a major antagonist of the series. In the final episodes, the Blue Knight declares a new nation for robots, Robotania, located on Antarctica. Lamp deceives the public into believing a house robot pushed a young girl down a flight of stairs, and the girl's father, Duke Red, declares war on Robotania. Most of the core cast becomes involved in the goal to stop the war between man and machine, until Atom convinces the Blue Knight that humans and robots can be friends. The Blue Knight departs Earth on Robotania, which is revealed to be a spacecraft. However, Lamp, who is still paranoid (despite the fact the robots have stopped their crusade against humanity), tries to destroy the spacecraft with a missile, but Atom blocks the attack and is seemingly taken offline.

Dr. Tenma manages to restore Atom, but erases his memories as Atom so that he can remain "Tobio" forever. Eventually, his memories are restored by his friends from school and his sister, Uran. In one final attempt to reclaim his lost son, Dr. Tenma goes to a laboratory in the Ministry of Science and tries to convince Atom to join him in ruling the world but the latter refuses. Dr. Tenma tries to kill himself to end his suffering, but Atom embraces and forgives him, causing Dr. Tenma to break down and embrace his son. Dr. Ochanomizu and the robotic police come to the rescue, and Dr. Tenma is willingly arrested and sent to prison. In the end, humans and robots start happily fresh and come closer together, and Atom appears to shed tears at the conclusion of the series.

== Characters ==
=== Astro's Family ===
Atom (Astro) (アトム, Atomu)
Voiced by: Makoto Tsumura (Japanese); Candi Milo, Mona Marshall (pilot) (English)
A robot with the world's best artificial brain and human-like mind. He was developed by the combined efforts of the Ministry of Science, with a huge budget and all the latest technology, and is modeled after Tobio Tenma, the deceased son of Dr. Tenma, his birth father. He lives with Dr. Ochanomizu in his house. Pure, kind-hearted, and with a great sense of justice, he aims to create a world where robots and humans can be friends. In this series, he makes use of a lot of nimble actions such as flight and speed rather than his 100K horsepower strength, and often gets into predicaments due to being outmatched.
Professor Ochanomizu / Dr. O'Shay (お茶の水博士, Ochanomizu-hakase)
Voiced by: Hisashi Katsuta (Japanese); Wally Wingert, Tony Pope (pilot) (English)
A robot scientist and director of the Ministry of Science. He is the first to sense the "budding of the mind" in the evolving robots, and begins to think that robots need human rights and be friends with humans. He is portrayed as being a bit clumsy and quick to anger, but he is very intelligent and compassionate.
Uran / Zoran (ウラン)
Voiced by: Miki Maruyama (Japanese); Susan Blu (English)
Atom's younger sister robot created by Dr. Ochanomizu. She has 50K horsepower strength, but does not have the ability to fly or use weapons like Atom. She is spoiled and selfish, which sometimes annoys Atom, but she also has a kind heart. She loves Atom as her older brother and is proud of him, but she hates being compared to him. In this series, she has the ability to communicate with animals.
Yūko Kisaragi (如月 夕子, Kisaragi Yūko)
Voiced by: Akiko Kawase (Japanese); Faith Salie, Mari Devon (pilot) (English)
Original character from the anime. As secretary of the Ministry of Science, she manages Dr. Ochanomizu's schedule, from work to rest. With Momo by her side, she gallantly rides around in a hovercar (modeled after the Mitsubishi Grandis, which was also used in the Atom Charity tie-in project with the real car) and does her job well. She is easily moved to tears.
Momo (モモ)
A state-of-the-art ostrich-shaped mobile robot, Momo is Yūko's assistant and pet. All of Yūko's work documents are stored in Momo's computer, and when she opens the monitor screen, she can see Dr. Ochanomizu's schedule, health care materials, etc., all at a glance. Momo is often Uran's playmate.
Robita (ロビタ)
Voiced by: Naoki Tatsuta (Japanese); Jennifer Darling, Jessica Straus (pilot) (English)
A housekeeping robot that takes care of all the household chores at the Ochanomizu residence. He also serves as a childcare and education robot for Atom and Uran. In addition to taking care of Dr. Ochanomizu, he is extremely hectic.

=== Allies ===
Tamao / Alejo (タマオ)
Voiced by: Motoko Kumai (Japanese); Lara Jill Miller (English)
Atom's classmate at elementary school who first appears in episode 4. He is a mechanical enthusiast who has converted his air pedalo into a sailing ship. He also loves robots, and is proud to have a friend like Atom. He is a hasty and good-natured person. In this series, he wears modern fashion, but keeps his trademark round glasses.
Kenichi / Kennedy (ケンイチ, Ken'ichi)
Voiced by: Yūko Satō (Japanese); Candi Milo (English)
Atom's classmate at elementary school who first appears in episode 4. He is small in stature, but is very clever and is often the leader of the group. He is not prejudiced against Atom as a robot, and treats him like a human being. He is considerate of Atom's loneliness due to his being a robot, and tries to let him participate in competitions such as sports day, which Atom is not allowed to take part in. His dream is to become a soccer player. In this series, his skin has been updated to be darker, reminiscent of Latin or African descent.
Shibugaki / Abercrombie (四部垣)
Voiced by: Susumu Chiba (Japanese); Sandy Martin (English)
Atom's classmate at elementary school who first appears in episode 4. Because of his father's influence, he thinks of robots as machines that work for humans, and is harsh towards Atom at first, but when Atom tries to help him, he changes his mind and they become close. He is a large man, but surprisingly timid, straightforward and likable. In this series, his face has been drastically redesigned to look white, with blond hair, blue eyes, freckles, and buck teeth. Except for the first time, he doesn't treat Atom badly like in the original work.
Reno (リノ, Rino)
Voiced by: Rika Matsumoto (Japanese); Candi Milo (English)
Abandoned by his parents, he was raised by members of a robot circus for 11 years, and he considers robots to be like family. After meeting Atom and his friends in an incident, Dr. Ochanomizu approves of his skills in robotics, and he begins studying robotics in Metro City. During the Robotania riots, in order to stop Duke Red from waging an all-out war against the robots, he takes his daughter, Ena, with him to the Antarctic where the battle is fought.
Ena (エナ)
Voiced by: Akiko Kōmoto (Japanese); Susan Blu (English)
The daughter of Red (voiced by Tarō Ishida), a general in the Earth Federation Forces. In contrast to her father, who is extremely prejudiced against robots, she is a kind-hearted girl who treats robots without discrimination. She loves Kipp, an AI robot who works as her butler, but when she tries to protest against her father's attempt to forcibly remove him, she causes an unexpected accident that puts her in a coma and forces Duke Red to eliminate AI robots and Robotania. After waking up from the coma, she learns about the situation from Reno and heads to Robotania in Antarctica with him to stop Duke Red from running amok.
Midori Niwano (庭野 ミドリ, Niwano Midori)
Voiced by: Sanae Kobayashi (Japanese); Faith Salie (English)
A teacher at the elementary school that Atom and his friends attend. She first appears in episode 4. She sings to a robot at the robot expo, and is Atom's homeroom teacher, so she has a close relationship with robots.
Higeoyaji (ヒゲオヤジ)
Voiced by: Kōsei Tomita (Japanese); Wally Wingert (English)
The uncle of Yūko Kisaragi, an overly old-fashioned private detective who has an office in downtown Metro City. His real name is Shunsaku Ban (伴 俊作, Ban Shunsaku). He dislikes all things new and modern, and professes to dislike robots as well, but he can get along with both robots and animals if he is comfortable with them, and he has solved cases together with Atom and Uran (he calls Atom in particular an excellent assistant). He is a man of extraordinary insight, and his powers of deduction are quite impressive. He pretends to be a hard-boiled detective, but he is a bit of a screw-up.
Inspector Tawashi (タワシ警部, Tawashi keibu)
Voiced by: Banjō Ginga (Japanese); Bill Farmer, James Penrod (pilot) (English)
Captain of the Metro City Police Department. He sometimes asks for Atom's cooperation in solving crimes, but he has a hard time trusting him because Atom's creator is Dr. Tenma. He is troubled by the increasing number of robot crimes and is concerned about the existence of robots. In order to protect the peace of the city, he fights day and night with a hardened heart, but sometimes he shows a humanistic side.
Delta (デルタ, Deruta)
Voiced by: Akimitsu Takase (Japanese); Wally Wingert (English)
The captain of the ARRS (Anti-Robot Robot Squad), which is assigned by the Metro City Police Department. He uses the best survival tactics on Earth, can eliminate signs of life depending on the location, and uses a gun specially designed for the ARRS. He is proud to be the captain of his squad, and is not happy about Atom joining their investigation. He is a bit stubborn, but has a straightforward personality.
Epsilon (エプシロン, Epushiron)
Voiced by: Akiko Hiramatsu (Japanese); Faith Salie (English)
A robotic environmental observer. She can analyze the behavioral patterns of her opponents to determine their hiding places, and she can also analyze natural conditions with her weather sensors to use her "geographical advantage" in battle. She is a female-type, non-combat robot who does not like to fight, but she has a lot of power and can attack with a photon cannon. In the original work, she is a male robot working at an orphanage in Australia.
Harley (ハーレー, Hārē)
Voiced by: Kiyoyuki Yanada (Japanese); Wally Wingert (English)
A Robot Ball player who represents the Omega Knights. He is the most athletic robot in the world, and his brilliant play is very attractive. He respects the rules and does not like to play rough. He is the team's commander who scans throughout the game, predicting the enemy's actions and looking for passing and riding courses to score points.

=== Rivals ===
Atlas (アトラス, Atorasu)
Voiced by: Nobuyuki Hiyama (Japanese); Greg Cipes (English)
A combat robot that Tokugawa, a wealthy man, commissioned Dr. Tenma to build in order to revive his son, Daichi, who died in an accident. Controlled by Daichi's lonely memories and hatred of humans, including his father, he begins to repeatedly destroy things behind his parents' back. He is later resurrected as a collaborator of Robotania.
Pluto (プルートウ, Purūtō)
Voiced by: Akio Ōtsuka (Japanese); David Rasner (English)
A robot created by Shadow, with a mission to become the strongest in the world. As he interacts with Atom and the others, he begins to develop a sense of "friendship" and "companionship" in his growing electronic brain, and begins to question the idea of "fighting." In addition, the powerful and emotionless Dark Pluto (originally named Borr in the original work) appears. He is later resurrected as a collaborator of Robotania. His design has been drastically changed in this series, with a brown coloring reminiscent of a bison.
Hercules (ヘラクレス, Herakuresu)
Voiced by: Daiki Nakamura
World Robotting champion who was born in Athenia. A proud, knightly robotics warrior, he attacks with the Lightning Spear and a gust of wind called the Spark Shower that comes out of his shield. His relationship with the Blue Knight makes him question his own way of life, and he follows his ideals and decides to break away from humanity as a warrior in the Robotanian army.
Blue Knight (青騎士, Aokishi)
Voiced by: Hideyuki Tanaka (Japanese); Wally Wingert (English)
A character who has a major role in the second half of the series. He is a robot in the form of a mysterious blue knight who appears where robots are being abused by humans and saves them. He rides the robot horse Ao, uses a saber as a weapon, and can fire a beam by collecting electric shocks. He used to be a robot called "Blue Bon" that repaired the robots of the players in the underworld Robot Crush organized by Hamegg, but he couldn't stand the fact that robots were getting hurt for Hamegg's sake, and as a result of his rebellion, he was thrown out into space, where he was modified by Shadow and given the power of a Blue Knight. Because of his history, he has doubts about robots obeying humans, and he gathers robots that are in sync with his will as his friends. Initially, he fights alongside Atom, but they gradually come into conflict due to their differing opinions. Finally, he reaches the end of his patience with the AI robot Kipp, who was working for Duke Red, and rescues Kipp and other robots of the same type that were about to be dismantled and disposed of by human ego. In Antarctica, he and the robots he had collected declared the founding of the independent nation of Robotania, an ideal world for robots alone. However, after Atom's desperate persuasion and the willingness of some of the robots in Robotania, including Kipp, to coexist with humans, he makes peace with Atom. He agrees to Shadow's departure for the outer solar system, and leaves with the remaining robots of Robotania.

=== Antagonists ===
Dr. Tenma (天馬博士, Tenma-hakase)
Voiced by: Shinya Owada, Yugo Takahashi (young) (Japanese); Dorian Harewood, Peter Lurie (pilot) (English)
A genius robot scientist and former director of the Ministry of Science. He is also the creator of Atom and the main antagonist of this series. He is arrogant, self-centered, and extremely misanthropic, and is described as "loving no one" not only by Atom but also by his late son, Tobio. When he was the Director General of the Ministry of Science, he started to develop an intelligent robot to replace Tobio, who died in an accident, and created Atom, but as Atom's mind gradually grew, he began to rebel against him. As a result, he dares to take Atom to the Plant 7, which processes discarded robots, in order to test him. As a result, Atom gets angry at the sight of discarded robots, and destroys the plant. Fearful of the growth of robots with minds, Dr. Tenma uses the "Kill Ring" to force Atom to shut down his system, and then goes on a rampage to destroy all the robots with minds that were under development. This eventually brought him into conflict with Dr. Ochanomizu, and he was expelled from the Ministry of Science. Later, after seeing Atom being rebooted by Dr. Ochanomizu and evolving through the growth of his mind, he came to the conclusion that evolved robots have the potential to surpass humans as a species, and became obsessed with the crazy dream that his robots, including Atom, would rule the world, and turns into a mad scientist. In order to develop Atom into the most powerful robot, he creates his own alter ego, the robot Shadow, and through him causes various incidents in an attempt to make Atom the king of robots and himself the god of robots.
Shadow (シャドウ, Shadō)
Voiced by: Shinya Owada (Japanese); Dorian Harewood (English)
The creator of Pluto and Dark Pluto. He is a robot scientist who was created by Dr. Tenma, who needed someone who could make a stronger robot to evolve Atom, as a robot that would evolve like Atom. At first, he follows Dr. Tenma's instructions and causes a lot of chaos, but as he watches Atom's battles, he begins to change his mind. He was the one who converted Blue Bon, who had been working as a repair robot for Hamegg, into the Blue Knight, and was also his shadow collaborator. However, Shadow understood that conflict would cause unnecessary sacrifices, and in contrast to the Blue Knight, he was thinking of creating an ideal world for robots through a method other than war. During the Robotania riots, his true face under the mask, which was initially entirely mechanical, became the same face as Dr. Tenma's, and he began to rebel against Dr. Tenma. After the reconciliation between Atom and the Blue Knight, he activated the giant spaceship function of Robotania and traveled to the outer solar system with the Blue Knight and the people of Robotania.
Skunk Kusai (スカンク 草井, Sukanku Kusai)
Voiced by: Kazuki Yao (Japanese); Wally Wingert (English)
The boss of the underworld. He is not interested in world domination and is a thoroughgoing mammonist scoundrel with a cruel and twisted personality. He often uses robots to make money, but is always thwarted by Atom, and he gradually comes to hate him. However, he only hates Atom "personally" and is not an anti-robotist. He also professes to love robots because they are useful and loyal, but has no qualms about discarding robots that have outlived their usefulness.
Dr. Katō (Dr.カトウ)
Voiced by: Takehito Koyasu (Japanese); Wally Wingert (English)
An insane bomber who believes that destruction is the highest art form, and a former researcher at the Ministry of Science. He works with Lamp, but is not interested in anti-robotism, only in explosions. He is usually uncommunicative, but when he is dressed as a clown in holographic recordings, he becomes frenziedly cheerful. In the end, he uses aerial mines to give Lamp time to get to Antarctica, but the mines are shut down when Inspector Tawashi destroys the control switch. He himself was seized by police robots and arrested. At this time, his trademark sunglasses were removed, revealing for a brief moment his full face with its delicate features.
Katari (加田里)
Voiced by: Rikiya Koyama (Japanese); Wally Wingert (English)
An extremist member of an anti-robotist group. He and Lamp want to drive the AI robots out of the city. He pretends to be various people to drive the AI robots crazy, and shows them to the people to appeal the dangers of robots. He is a selfish and outrageous terrorist who is willing to sacrifice unrelated people and even Mimi (voiced by Yūko Miyamura), a girl who adores him, in order to ruin the reputation of AI robots.
In the manga adaptation by Akira Himekawa, he is a former chef who lost his job because of the robots, so he resents them and causes a flood, just like in the anime, but he himself gets caught in the flood and is saved by Atom. After that, he conspires with Lamp and Katō to blow up the Tokugawa conglomerate's lunar plant, but Atom and Atlas intervene, putting them at a disadvantage. At this point, Lamp gives up on him because "his face is too well known," and he tells Atom and Atlas how to deactivate the detonator while self-deprecating that he is "just a tool."
Rock Holmes (ロック・ホーム, Rokku Hōmu)
Voiced by: Fumiya Fujii (Japanese); Wally Wingert (English)
A psychic and criminal genius. He can manipulate any living thing at will, and is also a master of disguise, changing his appearance many times. With the power of the Firebird (see below), he evolves into a superhuman, and makes a dark move to become the king of the world. He deceives and uses Atom many times and breaks his heart. He is vile and self-centered, but because he is lonely and has no family, he puts a picture of a woman cut out from a magazine on the side of the road on his pendant and thinks it is his mother. In the past, he was subjected to special training, similar to human experimentation, at the ability development laboratory of a rebel organization that was trying to overthrow the government, and escaped at the age of 12. At that time, he was given a false memory that he was abandoned by his parents, which is the reason why Rock hates humans. Using Atom's energy, he summons the Moon Tower to Phoenix Island and tries to gain the power of the Firebird, which brings about evolution, but his evil heart causes it to run amok. He was saved by Atom, and at that time, Rock and Atom learned, through the power of the Firebird, the fact that his mother was too sick to live for long and that he would have been loved if he had not been abandoned, and was eventually arrested by the police.
Hamegg (ハムエッグ, Hamu Eggu)
Voiced by: Chō (Japanese); Wally Wingert (English)
An entertainer who runs the underworld Robot Crush. He thinks of robots only as tools for making money. He will take his robots anywhere in the universe to make money, and has a close relationship with the Blue Knight.
Acetylene Lamp (アセチレン・ランプ, Asechiren Ranpu)
Voiced by: Kōji Ishii (Japanese); Wally Wingert (English)
A critic, company president, politician, and anti-AI roboticist. He is a human supremacist who does not accept any intelligence other than human. He has entered the world of politics and become the spearhead of the anti-AI robot movement. Inwardly, however, he is tormented by PTSD (or rather, pangs of conscience) over having abandoned his robot named Friend who once saved him. He barely keeps his sanity by telling himself and spreading the word that "robots are tools, they don't need a heart." There was an instance that foreshadowed his reunion with Friend, but his attitude remained unchanged after that. Although he created the start of the Robotania riot and planned to eliminate robots completely, his plan failed due to Atom's persuasion of Robotania. However, not wanting to give up, Lamp tries to shoot down the Robotania spaceship boarded by the Blue Knight and Shadow with a large missile from his personal battleship, but this also ends in failure due to Atom's success. Although he is elated when he succeeds in destroying Atom with a missile explosion, he is finally abandoned by the corporate bigwigs who had been cooperating with him and loses all of his honor and position because the Robotania riot has resulted in the robots' status being raised and he himself is wanted as one of the main culprits. Having resented Atom and Dr. Tenma for this, Lamp boards the manned mobile weapon "Mount Armor" and sets out to eliminate them himself, but is defeated by Atom, who has regained his memory thanks to the efforts of his friends and Uran. In the end, he is seized by the police and arrested, and though Lamp still maintained that he had fought for the honor of humanity, Inspector Tawashi told him that he had no right to talk about human honor.
Dark Girls (ダーク・ガールズ, Dāku Gāruzu)
Voiced by: Mami Koyama (Sarah), Shōko Tsuda (Chris), Megumi Toyoguchi (Carla)
A dark robot disposal contractor group consisting of three women, Sarah, Chris, and Carla. They receive large sums of money from corporations and illegally dispose of large amounts of waste robots and other toxic materials. They have a giant snake robot named Naga as a pet. They are a sensational group of criminals who are not supposed to be seen by the public because of what they do, but they cause mysterious phenomena with their costumes, speeches, and trademark poses.
Minimini (ミニミニ)
Voiced by: Takeshi Aono (Japanese); Wally Wingert (English)
A villainous scientist and expert in ultraminiature robots. In order to make money by developing weapons that exploit Atom's Astro System, he uses "little tricks" to target Atom. The character was originally designed as Dr. Fooler.

== Production ==
The anime was created to commemorate Atom's birthday, April 7, 2003, as established in the original story. Therefore, the broadcast start date was also set to April 2003. The base of the series is different from the original Astro Boy, as it is more of an epic drama with various episodes depicting the coexistence, confrontation, all-out conflict, and reconciliation between robots and humans in a grounded and serious way. The series has a strong retro-futuristic style that is closer to American cartoons than Japanese animation, and some episodes were written by American scriptwriters. Kazuya Konaka, the director of the anime, testified that the American side had a different perception of Astro Boy as a bright and cheerful action-adventure in black-and-white animation, and had doubts about a story with a serious theme like the original.

The series is also a parent-child drama between Dr. Tenma and Atom, and there are several episodes related to other parent-child and pseudo-parent-child relationships. In terms of the setting, many aspects were drastically changed for the family audience. Shinya Owada, who plays Dr. Tenma, was a fan of Astro Boy. Although the series was produced in a 16:9 aspect ratio, it was broadcast in 13:9 at the request of the TV station.

The director, Kazuya Konaka, was a live-action director with no experience in animation, but he was hired because he had directed the 1996 live-action direct-to-video Black Jack film. Although Konaka was unsure about participating in an animated series, he decided to take part in the project because it was a chance to visualize Tezuka's representative work, and he said that he was able to produce the anime with the support of the excellent staff, including animation director Keiichirō Mochizuki. Many of the scriptwriters on the Japanese side worked on the Heisei Ultra series, in which Konaka also participated, but Konaka said that the scriptwriters were a natural group of people from the generation who had a strong attachment to Tezuka's works, and that Hirotoshi Kobayashi and Sadayuki Murai had known each other from outside the Ultra Series. Tezuka Productions wanted to keep the series on 35mm film, while Konaka wanted to use 3DCG, so they stuck to the already dwindling cel production method with a mix of 70% traditional and 30% digital animation.

Mari Shimizu, who had been the voice of Atom since the first anime, gave up the role on April 6, 2003, the day the first episode aired, so Makoto Tsumura took over the voice for this series. Each episode cost more than $250,000.

== Home media ==
In North America, Astro Boy was released on DVD in one single box set by Sony Pictures Home Entertainment in its United States edited form. On May 5, 2015, Mill Creek Entertainment re-released the United States edited complete series on DVD in Region 1. On May 2, 2019, Mill Creek Entertainment re-released the series yet again with different cover art and a slipcover.

== Other media ==
=== Manga ===
The anime was adapted into a manga illustrated by Akira Himekawa that ran in the March–July 2003 issues of Shogakukan's Shōgaku Gonensei, the April–May 2003 issues of Shōgaku Rokunensei, and the April–August 2003 issues of Bessatsu CoroCoro Comic. Shogakukan later compiled the series into three tankōbon volumes.

It was also released in English in Singapore by Chuang Yi.

=== Video games ===
Two video games based on the 2003 TV series were released by Sega. Astro Boy: Omega Factor is a beat 'em up video game developed by Treasure Co. Ltd for the Game Boy Advance receiving release worldwide between 2003 and 2005. An action video game, simply titled Astro Boy, was developed by Sonic Team and released for the PlayStation 2 in 2004 in Japan and North America and in 2005 in Europe.

=== Theatrical works ===
==== Osamu Tezuka Animation Theater special episodes ====
Three original theatrical movies were shown exclusively at the 300-inch theater in the Kyōto Station building's "Kyoto Osamu Tezuka World" until its closure on January 16, 2011. All three films lasted 20 minutes and 30 seconds and were directed by Osamu Dezaki, with Mayumi Morita writing the scripts, Masayoshi Nishida serving as animation director, and Masami Saitō serving as art director.

- Astro Boy: Mighty Atom Special Episode – The Secret of Atom's Birth (ASTROBOY 鉄腕アトム ～特別編：アトム誕生の秘密～, ASTROBOY Tetsuwan Atomu ~Tokubetsu-hen: Atomu tanjō no himitsu~)

Released on April 6, 2003. A story about Dr. Tenma creating Atom as a replacement for Tobio.

- Astro Boy: Mighty Atom Special Episode – Ivan's Planet - Robots and Humans' Friendship (ASTROBOY 鉄腕アトム 特別編：イワンの惑星 ～ロボットと人間の友情～, ASTROBOY Tetsuwan Atomu tokubetsu-hen: Iwan no wakusei ~Robotto to ningen no yūjō~)

Released on September 13, 2003. A story about an abandoned guardsman-type robot named Ivan.

- Astro Boy: Mighty Atom Special Episode – The Glorious Earth - You Are Blue and Beautiful... (ASTROBOY 鉄腕アトム 特別編：輝ける地球 ～あなたは青く、美しい...～, ASTROBOY Tetsuwan Atomu tokubetsu-hen: Kagayakeru hoshi ~Anata wa aoku, utsukushii...~)

Released on February 7, 2004. Two hundred years later, on an Earth ruled by robots, a young boy meets Atom, who is no longer in service and is on display.

==== Science Museum screenings ====
- Robot: To the Astro Boy of My Dreams (ROBOT〜夢のアストロボーイへ〜, ROBOT ~Yume no Asutoro Bōi e~)

A clip that was produced under the planning and supervision of the National Museum of Emerging Science and Innovation (Miraikan) as video content for its spherical theater, Dome Theater Gaia. It was shown at the Fukuoka Science Museum and other science museums from April 15, 2004, and introduces actual robot technology with the digital animation of Atom.

==== Planetarium screenings ====
- Astro Boy Mighty Atom: Lunar Base - The Mystery of the Robots' Disappearance (ASTRO BOY 鉄腕アトム〜月面基地・消えたロボットの謎〜, ASTRO BOY Tetsuwan Atomu ~Getsumenkichi kieta robotto no nazo~)

Screened in planetariums between May 29 and August 31, 2004. Strange incidents occur at the Moon base, and a rocket is launched to the space station. Atom must save the space station.

==== IMAX screenings ====
- Astro Boy: Mighty Atom – Visitor of 100,000 Light Years, IGZA (ASTRO BOY 鉄腕アトム 10万光年の来訪者・IGZA, ASTRO BOY tetsuwan Atomu 10-man kōnen no raihōsha IGZA)

Japan's first full-length animated film in large-scale IMAX format, released on September 1, 2005, and directed by Yoshio Takeuchi. The interplanetary spacecraft Galileo II is carrying Atom and his friends to Titan, a satellite of Saturn. However, a mechanical life form named Igza appears on Titan and tries to destroy the humans.

== Reception ==
The 2003 version of Astro Boy was extremely well reviewed by Zac Bertschy of Anime News Network, receiving a grade of A+ in every category and comments of, "It's perfect."

The series won the award for best work in the Television Category at the 2004 Tokyo International Anime Fair.
