= Astro Boy (2004 video game) =

- Japanese cover art
- Developer: Sonic Team
- Publisher: Sega
- Director: Hideki Anbo
- Producer: Mineko Okamura
- Designer: Hiroyuki Takanabe
- Programmer: Hitoshi Nakanishi
- Artist: Noboru Hotta
- Writers: Yosuke Yoshizawa; Atsushi Ota; Nobuo Nakagawa
- Composers: Takashi Yoshimatsu; Yutaka Minobe; Naofumi Hataya; Mariko Nanba; Teruhiko Nakagawa; Fumie Kumatani; Hideaki Kobayashi; Norihiko Machida
- Platform: PlayStation 2
- Release: JP: April 18, 2004; NA: August 17, 2004; EU: February 11, 2005; AU: February 23, 2005
- Genre: Action
- Mode: Single-player

Astro Boy (アストロボーイ・鉄腕アトム, Asutoro Bōi: Tetsuwan Atomu; "Astro Boy: Mighty Atom") is a video game based on the 2003 anime television series, produced by Sonic Team and published by Sega exclusively for the PlayStation 2. It was released in Japan on April 18, 2004, followed by a North American release on August 17, 2004, a European release on February 11, 2005, and an Australasian release on February 23, 2005.

Astro Boy is a 3D third person adventure game and has open world capabilities; throughout the game, Astro is controlled by the player and learns more of his abilities that can be used outside of battles and also in battles as well. Players explore a series of many levels towards a particular game cycle of events. Astro Boy also has a day and night cycle, depending on the said storyline and events throughout the game.

The game received a generally mixed response upon release.

== Reception ==
Reception

Aggregate score
Aggregator	Score
Metacritic	54/100

Review scores
Publication	Score
1Up.com	C+
Electronic Gaming Monthly	4.33/10
Famitsu	28/40
G4	2/5
Game Informer	5.5/10
GamePro	3/5
GameSpot	4.9/10
GameSpy	2/5
GameZone	5.5/10
IGN	4/10
Official U.S. PlayStation Magazine	3/5
The Sydney Morning Herald	2.5/5

Astro Boy received "mixed or average" reviews upon release, according to review aggregator Metacritic.

Game Informer's Matt Helgeson gave it a 5.5/10, commenting: "The amount of time you have to spend tweaking your viewpoint with the shoulder buttons is ridiculous, an unwanted flashback to early 3D platformers like Gex and Spyro the Dragon." In a second opinion, Matt Miller rated it 6.75/10, praising "incredible special effects and a smorgasbord of boss battles", but stating that it is "unlikely to entrance for more than a weekend".
