= List of Black Jack chapters =

The following is a list of chapters for the Japanese manga series Black Jack. It was created by Osamu Tezuka and published in Akita Shoten's Weekly Shōnen Champion from November 19, 1973, to October 14, 1983.

Some of the manga chapters were published in English by Viz Media throughout Volume 3 Issue 9 to Volume 4 Issue 8 of their manga anthology magazine, Manga Vizion. It was later released as two graphic novels. Vertical, Inc. has acquired the license and released the Black Jack episodes in the order that Tezuka indicated for the hardcover Akita "Deluxe Edition". The order is listed below.

== Volume list ==
No.	Original release date	Original ISBN	English release date	English ISBN
1	April 5, 1987	978-4-253-09969-1	September 23, 2008	978-1-934287-27-9
001. "Is There A Doctor?" (医者はどこだ!, "Isha wa Doko Da!"); 167. "The First Storm of Spring" (春一番, "Haru Ichiban"); 012. "Teratoid Cystoma" (畸形嚢腫, "Kikei Nōshu"); 052. "The Face Sore" (人面瘡, "Jinmensō"); 029. "Sometimes Like Pearls" (ときには真珠のように, "Toki ni wa Shinju no Yō ni"); 050. "Confluence" (めぐり会い, "Meguriai"); 086. "The Painting is Dead!" (絵が死んでいる!, "E ga Shindeiru!"); 185. "Star, Magnitude Six" (六等星, "Rokutōsei"); 057. "Black Queen" (ブラック·クイーン, "Burakku Kuiin"); ---. "U-18 Knew" (U-18は知っていた, "U-18 wa Shitteita"); 054. "The Legs of an Ant" (アリの足, "Ari no ashi"); 049. "Two Loves" (二つの愛, "Futatsu no Ai")
Is There A Doctor? – To have Black Jack save his son, a tycoon frames somebody to be used as spare parts. The First Storm of Spring – A woman begins seeing a man after getting eye surgery. Teratoid Cystoma – Black Jack turns a kind of teratoma into a human named Pinoko. The Face Sore – A man gets a face sore literally on his face. Sometimes Like Pearls – Black Jack remembers how his mentor, Dr. Honma, accidentally got a scalpel in his stomach. Confluence – When an old friend visits Black Jack, Pinoko gets jealous. The Painting is Dead! – After witnessing a nuclear test, an artist wants to be alive long enough to finish his last painting. Star, Magnitude Six – A hospital is looking for a new director. Black Queen – One doctor named Konomi Kuwata is called the female Black Jack. U-18 Knew – An automatic computer demands Black Jack. The Legs of an Ant – A boy walks again after watching ants. Two Loves – A boy teaches a man who hit him with his truck to make sushi for him.
2	May 25, 1987	978-4-253-09970-7	November 18, 2008	978-1-934287-28-6
061. "Needle" (針, "Hari"); 089. "Granny" (おばあちゃん, "Obāchan"); 090. "The Ballad of the Killer Whale" (シャチの詩, "Shachi no Shi"); 168. "To Each His Own" (三者三様, "Sansha sanyō"); 078. "Emergency Shelter" (地下壕にて, "Chikagō ni te"); 015. "Dirtjacked" (ダーティ·ジャック, "Dāti Jakku"); 099. "Where Art Thou, Friend?" (友よいずこ, "Tomo yo Izuko"); 023. "Kidnapping" (誘拐, "Yūkai"); 239. "Assembly Line Care" (流れ作業, "Nagare sagyō"); 201. "Helping Each Other" (助け合い, "Tasukeai"); 055. "Stradivarius" (ストラディバリウス, "Sutoradibariusu"); 116. "Pinoko's Challenge" (ハッスルピノコ, "Hassuru Pinoko"); 091. "Hospital Jack" (病院ジャック, "Byōin Jakku"); 126. "The Blind Acupuncturist" (座頭医師, "Zatō ishi")
Needle – A man gets a syringe needle stuck in his bloodstream. Granny – Black Jack meets a rude grandmother and her family. The Ballad of the Killer Whale – Black Jack remembers an orca he saved. To Each His Own – A boy helps Black Jack treat a man who convinced the former to live. Emergency Shelter – Black Jack gets locked in a shelter with other men. Dirtjacked – A teacher and her schoolchildren get trapped in a cave-in. Where Art Thou, Friend? – How Black Jack got his skin graft from his friend, Takashi. Kidnapping – Pinoko gets kidnapped so Black Jack can't perform an operation. Assembly Line Care – An overwhelmed doctor keeps charging minimal fees for his operations. Helping Each Other – When a company tries to sacrifice the life of a man, Black Jack must save him to thank him for clearing his name. Stradivarius – Maestro Morozoff, the famous musician, loses his violin in a massive blizzard. Pinoko's Challenge – Pinoko tries to go to high school. Hospital Jack – Black Jack gets stuck in a hospital when its invaded by terrorists. The Blind Acupuncturist – Black Jack meets an acupuncturist named Biwamaru who is blind.
3	July 15, 1987	978-4-253-09971-4	January 20, 2009	978-1-934287-41-5
164. "Disowned Son" (勘当息子, "Kandō Musuko"); 051. "Shrinking" (ちぢむ!!, "Chijimu!!"); 123. "Dingoes" (ディンゴ, "Dingo"); 124. "Your Mistake!" (きみのミスだ!, "Kimi no misu da!"); 155. "The Robin and the Boy" (コマドリと少年, "Komadori to shōnen"); 143. "The Boy Who Came from the Sky" (空からきた子ども, "Sora kara kita kodomo"); 157. "Black Jack in Hospital" (B·J入院す, "BJ nyūin su"); 212. "A Woman's Case" (ある女の場合, "Aru onna no baai"); 056. "Two Dark Doctors" (ふたりの黒い医者, "Futari no kuroi isha"); 132. "The Residents" (研修医たち, "Kenkyūi tachi"); 193. "Recollections of a Spinster" (ある老婆の思い出, "Aru rouba no omoide"); 013. "Pinoko Loves You" (ピノコ愛してる, "Pinoko aishiteru"); 127. "Tenacity" (執念, "Shūnen"); 102. "An Odd Relationship" (奇妙な関係, "Kimyō na kankei"); 042. "Baby Blues" (赤ちゃんのバラード, "Aka chan no barādo")
Disowned Son – Black Jack helps a woman reconcile with her fourth son. Shrinking – Africa is hit with a fatal disease causing people to shrink. Dingoes – Black Jack gets lost in an Australian desert. Your Mistake! – A nurse gets blamed for the mistake of a hospital director's son. The Robin and the Boy – A robin keeps giving money to Black Jack. The Boy Who Came from the Sky – Two Uran doctors defect from their country to bring their son to Black Jack. Black Jack in Hospital – Black Jack gets into an accident and is forced to stay in a hospital. A Woman's Case – After being saved by Black Jack, a model looks back on her life. Two Dark Doctors – Black Jack competes over a rival doctor, Dr. Kiriko, during the surgery of a mother of two. The Residents – Three students want Black Jack to watch their first surgery. Recollections of a Spinster – An old woman remembers how she once helped Black Jack. Pinoko Loves You – Black Jack gets frustrated by Pinoko's love and parents of a son he operated on. Tenacity – A dying man wishes to cure a cancer patient. An Odd Relationship – A policeman and robber bond during their surgeries. Baby Blues – A delinquent worries about a baby.
4	August 15, 1987	978-4-253-09972-1	March 17, 2009	978-1-934287-43-9
232. "False Image" (虚像, "Kyozō"); 120. "The Scream" (悲鳴, "Himei"); 197. "Drifter in a Ghost Town" (ゴーストタウンの流れ者, "Gōsuto taun no nagare mono"); 080. "Pinoko Love Story" (ピノコ·ラブストーリー, "Pinoko rabu sutōrī"); 083. "The Sewer Way" (地下水道, "Chika Suidō"); 205. "The Sea Smells of Romance" (海は恋のかおり, "Umi wa koi no kaori"); 218. "Tetsu of the Yamanote Line" (山手線の哲, "Yamanote no Tetsu"); 188. "Titles" (肩書き, "Katagaki"); 148. "Lost and Found" (落としもの, "Otoshimono"); 040. "Burned Doll" (焼け焦げた人形, "Yakekogeta Ningyō"); 110. "The Heart of a Giant" (デカの心臓, "Deka no shinzō"); 069. "Gas" (ガス, "Gasu"); 053. "From Afar" (はるかなる国から, "Harukanaru Kuni Kara"); 024. "Thieving Dog" (万引犬, "Manbiki Inu")
False Image – Black Jack tries to get a teacher turned drug addict to attend a reunion. The Scream – A beloved school announcer loses her voice. Drifter in a Ghost Town – Black Jack meets a fugitive in a Western town. Pinoko Love Story – A boy Pinoko supposedly falls in love with has a case of Situs inversus. The Sewer Way – Revolutionaries recruit Black Jack after a botched bombing. The Sea Smells of Romance – A sailor who knows Kisaragi wants lots of tattoos removed. Tetsu of the Yamanote Line – Tetsu pickpockets from a yakuza and has his fingers cut off. Titles – An emperor wants a doctor to watch Black Jack's skills. Lost and Found – A man loses a check to pay for his wife's surgery. Burned Doll – A father donates his skin to saved his burned son. The Heart of a Giant – A kid with Gigantism has a small heart. Gas – Pinoko accidentally swallows a pill with Potasium Cyanide. From Afar – When a world famous doctor operates on the daughter of a Swedish minister, Black Jack does so with a girl with the same condition. Thieving Dog – Pinoko adopts a dog named Largo after forcing Black Jack to cure her.
5	October 5, 1987	978-4-253-09973-8	May 26, 2009	978-1-934287-55-2
151. "Hospital" (ホスピタル, "Hosupitaru"); 074. "Quite a Tongue" (なんという舌, "Nan to Iu Shita"); 223. "Asking for Water" (もらい水, "Moraimizu"); 236. "Yet False the Days" (されどいつわりの日々, "Saredo Itsuwari no Hibi"); 199. "The Last Train" (終電車, "Shūdensha"); 079. "There was a Valve!" (弁があった!, "Ben ga atta!"); 141. "Two at the Baths" (湯治場の二人, "Tōjiba no futari"); 222. "Pinoko's Mystery" (ピノコ·ミステリー, "Pinoko misuterī"); 227. "Imprint" (刻印, "Kokuin"); 146. "Water Almost Transparent" (限りなく透明に近い水, "Kagirinaku Tōmei ni Chikai Mizu"); tankōbon: "99.9% Water" (99.9%の水, "99.9% no Mizu"): 170. "The Helper" (助っ人, "Suketto"); 100. "Country Clinic" (古和医院, "Kowaiin"); 063. "Wolf Girl" (オオカミ少女, "Ookami Shōjo"); 006. "On a Snowy Night" (雪の夜ばなし, "Yuki no Yorubanashi")
6	November 15, 1987	978-4-253-09974-5	July 28, 2009	978-1-934287-56-9
179. "Surgical Knife" (メス, "Mesu"); tankōbon: "Downpour" (土砂降り, "Doshaburi"): 180. "Downpour" (土砂降り, "Doshaburi"); 070. "A Body Turning to Stone" (からだが石に..., "Karada ga Ishi ni..."); 125. "The Old Man and the Tree" (老人と木, "Rōjin to Ki"); 018. "Twice Dead" (二度死んだ少年, "Nido Shinda Shōnen"); 033. "Lion-Face Disease" (獅子面病, "Shishimenbyō"); 094. "Con Man, Aspiring" (サギ師志願, "Sagishi Shigan"); 240. "Brachydactyly" (短指症, "Tanshishō"); 066. "Amidst Fire and Ashes" (火と灰の中, "Hi to Hai no Naka"); 088. "Revenge" (報復, "Hōfuku"); 137. "Vibration" (振動, "Shindō"); 011. "Nadare" (ナダレ, "Nadare"); 032. "Three in a Box" (閉ざされた三人, "Tozasareta Sannin"); 230. "The Substitute" (身代わり, "Migawari"); 046. "Avatar of Death" (死に神の化身, "Shinigami no Keshin"); tankōbon: "Terror Virus" (恐怖菌, "Kyōfukin")
7	December 30, 1987	978-4-253-09975-2	September 22, 2009	978-1-934287-60-6
214. "Guys and Birds" (鳥たちと野郎ども, "Toritachi to Yaroudomo"); 017. "The Gray Mansion" (灰色の館, "Haiiro no Yakata"); 062. "A Cat and Shozo" (ネコと庄造と, "Neko to Shōzō to"); 067. "Beryl" (緑柱石, "Ryokuchūseki"); tankōbon: "The Two Pinokos" (ふたりのピノコ, "Futari no Pinoko"): 115. "Unexploded Bomb" (不発弾, "Fuhatsudan"); 183. "Younger Brother" (おとうと, "Otōto"); 161. "High and Low" (上と下, "Ue to Shita"); 136. "Goribei of Senjogahara" (戦場が原のゴリベエ, "Senjō-ga-Hara no Goribee"); 221. "The Kuroshio: A Memoir" (黒潮号メモ, "Kuroshio-gō Memo"); 160. "Black and White" (白い正義, "Shiroi Seigi"); 190. "A Hill for One" (一ぴきだけの丘, "Ippiki Dake no Oka"); 121. "Cloudy, Later Fair" (曇りのち晴れ, "Kumori Nochi Hare"); 119. "Hurricane" (ハリケーン, "Harikeen"); 111. "Timeout" (タイムアウト, "Taimuauto")
8	February 20, 1988	978-4-253-09976-9	November 17, 2009	978-1-934287-61-3
035. "What Lurks the Mountain" (なにかが山を..., "Nanika ga Yama wo..."); 022. "Fits" (発作, "Hossa"); 043. "A Wrong Diagnosis" (誤診, "Goshin"); 072. "The Tattooed Man" (イレズミの男, "Irezumi no Otoko"); 092. "Abnormal Pregnancy" (奇胎, "Kitai"); 096. "On the Way" (道すがら, "Michisugara"); 118. "Cold Disdain" (白い目, "Shiroi Me"); 129. "A Visit from a Killer" (殺しがやってくる, "Koroshi ga Yattekuru"); 234. "Accident" (再会, "Saikai"); 177. "One Hour to Death" (死への一時間, "Shi E No Ichijikan"); 181. "Random Killer" (通り魔, "Tōrima"); 104. "Pinoko Goes West" (ピノコ西へ行く, "Pinoko Nishi E Yuku"); 200. "Swapped" (すりかえ, "Surikae"); 207. "Finish" (しめくくり, "Shimekukuri")
9	April 25, 1988	978-4-253-09977-6	January 19, 2010	978-1-934287-73-6
034. "Teacher and Pupil" (ある教師と生徒, "Aru kyōshi to seito"); 030. "Pinoko Lives" (ピノコ生きてる, "Pinoko Ikiteru"); 044. "Eyewitness" (目撃者, "Mokugekisha"); 182. "As He Wills" (ご意見無用, "Go-iken Muyō"); 152. "The Promise" (約束, "Yakusoku"); 194. "Three-Legged Race" (二人三脚, "Futari Sankyaku"); 242. "A Question of Priorities" (オペの順番, "Ope no Junban"); 064. "You Did It!!" (おまえが犯人だ!!, "Omae ga Hannin Da!!"); 189. "Gunshot Wound" (銃創, "Jūsō"); 027. "Mistress Shiraha" (白葉さま, "Shiraha-sama"); 117. "Gift to the Future" (未来への贈りもの, "Mirai E no Okurimono"); 133. "Sun Dolls" (てるてる坊主, "Teruteru Bouzu"); 122. "Third Time's the Charm" (三度目の正直, "Sando-me no Shoujiki"); 169. "Guinea Pig" (モルモット, "Morumotto")
10	June 20, 1988	978-4-253-09978-3	March 23, 2010	978-1-934287-74-3
186. "Avina's Isle" (アヴィナの島, "Avina no Shima"); 068. "The Mask Chosen" (えらばれたマスク, "Erabareta Masuku"); 231. "Revenge is My Life" (復讐こそわが命, "Fukushū Koso Wa ga Inochi"); 149. "Unfinished House" (やり残しの家, "Yarinokoshi no Ie"); 002. "Strangers at Sea" (海のストレンジャー, "Umi no Sutorenjaa"); 038. "Pinoko Returns!" (ピノコ還る!, "Pinoko Kaeru!"); 220. "The Man Who Threw Up Capsules" (カプセルをはく男, "Kapuseru o Haku Otoko"); 233. "Flesh and Blood" (骨肉, "Kotsuniku"); 142. "Burglary" (盗難, Tōnan); 025. "Ashes and Diamonds" (灰とダイヤモンド, "Hai to Daiyamondo"); 173. "Hot Night" (あつい夜, "Atsui Yoru"); 174. "Ransom" (身の代金, "Mi no Daijin"); 213. "Mannequin and Officer" (人形と警官, "Ningyou to keikan"); 159. "Playing Doctor" (お医者さんごっこ, "Oisha-san Gokko")
11	August 15, 1988	978-4-253-09979-0	May 25, 2010	978-1-934287-78-1
071. "Spasm" (けいれん, "Keiren"); 073. "Smithereens" (こっぱみじん, "Koppamijin"); 172. "Life Bond" (命のきずな, "Inochi no Kizuna"); 008. "Sealed Memory" (とざされた記憶, "Tozasareta Kioku"); 098. "The Whispers of a Dog" (犬のささやき, "Inu no Sasayaki"); 147. "Showa Shinzan" (昭和新山, "Shōwa Shinzan"); 105. "Visitor in the Snow" (雪の訪問者, "Yuki no Houmonsha"); 203. "Grasping Duo" (がめつい同士, "Gametsui Dōshi"); 235. "Talk" (話し合い, "Hanashiai"); 226. "Pocket Monkey" (ポケットモンキー, "Poketto Monkii"); 082. "Call Sign" (ハローCQ, "Harō CQ"); 131. "Fear in Blue" (青い恐怖, "Aoi Kyōfu"); 219. "The War Never Ends" (戦争はなおも続く, "Sensō ha Nao mo Tsuzuku"); 229. "The SL Called Life" (人生という名のSL, "Jinsei to Iu Na no SL")
12	December 25, 1988	978-4-253-09980-6	July 27, 2010	978-1-934287-79-8
206. "Wildcat Boy" (山猫少年, "Yamaneko Shōnen"); 176. "Signal" (信号, "Shingō"); 101. "Invader" (侵略者(インベーダー), "Shinryakusha (Inbeedaa)"); 045. "White Lion" (白いライオン, "Shiroi raion"); 084. "Tatsu The Outie" (デベソの達, "Debeso no Tatsu"); 010. "Son of Hariti" (鬼子母神の息子, "Kishibojin no Musuko"); 195. "The Second One" (二人目がいた, "Futari-me ga Ita"); 224. "The Boy In The Sealed Room" (密室の少年, "Misshitsu no Shōnen"); 021. "Save the Baby!" (その子を殺すな!, "Sono Ko o Korosu Na!"); 108. "The Bear" (クマ, "Kuma"); 145. "Operation of the Spirit" (霊のいる風景, "Rei no Iru Fūkei"); 103. "Looking Good" (帰ってきたあいつ, "Kaettekita Aitsu"); 241. "Prone to Laughter" (笑い上戸, "Waraijōgō")
13	January 10, 1994	978-4-253-09981-3	January 25, 2011	978-1-934287-89-7
093. "Water and the Badness" (水とあくたれ, "Mizu to Akutare"); 007. "The Pirate's Arm" (海賊の腕, "Kaizoku no Ude"); 134. "Death of an Actress" (あるスターの死, "Aru Sutaa no Shi"); 140. "Teratoid Cystoma, Part 2" (畸形嚢腫パート2, "Kikei Nōshu Paato 2"); 065. "The Cursed Operation" (のろわれた手術, "Norowareta Shujutsu"); 191. "A Fussy Suicide" (小うるさい自殺者, "Kourusai Jisatsusha"); 014. "Aftereffects" (後遺症, "Kōishō"); 215. "A Night in a Cottage" (山小屋の一夜, "Yamagoya no Hitoya"); 163. "Honma's Hematoma" (本間血腫, "Honma Kesshu"); 211. "A Challenge of the Third Kind" (未知への挑戦, "Mirai E no Chōsen"); 162. "Timid Cyrano" (気が弱いシラノ, "Ki ga Yowai Shirano"); 225. "Move, Solomon!" (動けソロモン, "Ugoke Soromon"); 210. "The Day He Picked Up a Runaway" (家出を拾った日, "Iede o Hirotta Hi"); 097. "A Lucky Man" (幸運な男, Kōun na Otoko)
14	August 10, 1995	978-4-253-09982-0	May 31, 2011	978-1-934287-94-1
060. "The Corsican Brothers" (コルシカの兄弟, "Korushika no Kyoudai"); 048. "The Third Call" (電話が三度なった, "Denwa ga Sando Natta"); 085. "A Transient Love" (かりそめの愛を, "Karisome no Ai Wo"); 087. "Full-Moon Disease" (満月病, "Mangetsubyō"); 095. "The Devil" (悪魔, "Akuma"); tankōbon: "Captain Satan" (魔王大尉, "Akuma Taii"): 106. "Urashima" (浦島太郎, "Urashima Tarō"); 107. "Little Devil" (小さな悪魔, "Chiisana Akuma"); 114. "Stop Drawing!" (ペンをすてろ!, "Pen o Sutero!"); 150. "A Rapid Current" (激流, "Gekiryū"); 153. "Record of A Director" (ある監督の記録, "Aru Kantoku no Kiroku"); tankōbon: "There Were Two Films" (フィルムは二つあった, "Firumu wa Futatsu Atta"): 178. "The Man Swallowed by a Whale" (鯨にのまれた男, "Kujira ni Nomareta Otoko"); 204. "The Vanished Noise" (消えさった音, "Kiesatta Oto"); 208. "Black Jack Disease" (ブラック·ジャック病, "Burakku Jakku-byō"); 237. "Just Like B.J." (B·Jそっくり, B.J Sokkuri)
15	December 20, 2000	978-4-253-09983-7	July 26, 2011	978-1-935654-00-1
081. "Treasure Island" (宝島, "Takarajima"); 075. "A Star is Born" (スター誕生, "Sutaa Tanjō"); 019. "Leaf Buds" (木の芽, "Ki no Me"); 077. "Dedicated to Dracula" (ドラキュラに捧ぐ, "Dorakyura ni Sasagu"); 109. "Dialogue with the Dead" (死者との対話, "Shisha to no Taiwa"); 112. "Homesickness" (望郷, "Bōkyō"); 130. "Fog" (霧, "Kiri"); 135. "A Happening at Dawn" (夜明けのできごと, "Yoake no Dekigoto"); 138. "The Next Chance" (きたるべきチャンス, "Kitarubeki Chansu"); 156. "A Surgeon Lives for Music" (音楽のある風景, "Ongaku no Aru Fūkei"); 175. "A Clock in the Dark" (闇時計, "Yamidokei"); 192. "An Arrangement of Life" (命を生ける, "Inochi o Ikeru"); 217. "A Cholera Scare" (コレラさわぎ, "Korera Sawagi"); 202. "Suggestion in the 20th Year" (20年目の暗示, "20nen-me no Anji")
16	March 20, 2001	978-4-253-09984-4	October 11, 2011	978-1-935654-01-8
004. "Anaphylaxis" (アナフィラキシー, "Anafirakishii"); 003. "Miyuki and Ben" (ミユキとベン, "Miyuki to Ben"); 154. "Lost Youth" (失われた青春, "Ushinawareta Seishun"); 059. "I Want My Brother Back!" (にいちゃんをかえせ!!, "Niichan o Kaese!!"); 113. "Another J" (もう一人のJ, "Mou Hitori no J"); 047. "Gleamy Eyes" (光る目, "Hikaru Me"); 166. "Lynching" (リンチ, "Rinchi"); 184. "The Nekogami Clan" (猫上家の人々, "Nekogami-ke no Hitobito"); 198. "Bath of the Floating World" (浮世風呂, "Ukiyo-buro"); 196. "Cancer Hunter" (腫瘍狩り, Shuyōgari); 216. "Bad Stunt" (裏目, "Urame"); 238. "A Passed Moment" (過ぎ去りし一瞬, "Sugisarishi Isshun")
17	October 12, 2004	978-4-253-09991-2	November 29, 2011	978-1-935654-11-7
016. "Pinoko is Adopted" (ピノコ再び, "Pinoko Futatabi"); 005. "A Girl Who Became a Bird" (人間鳥, "Ningentori"); 009. "Two Shujis" (ふたりの修二, "Futari no Shuji"); 026. "Captain Park" (パク船長, "Paku Senchō"); 031. "Avatar" (化身, "Keshin"); 039. "Pure Chinese Restaurant" (純華飯店, "Junka hanten"); 144. "Money! Money! Money!" (金!金!金!, "Kane! Kane! Kane!"); 187. "Test of Courage" (キモダメシ, "Kimodameshi"); 158. "The Phoenix" (不死鳥, "Fushichō"); 165. "A Visiting Memory" (おとずれた思い出, "Otozureta omoide"); 228. "After the Typhoon" (台風一過, "Taifū ikka")

== Chapters not collected in Akita Deluxe edition ==
Some chapters listed here were included with the hardcover editions of Vertical Inc.'s publication of Black Jack. These have been noted.

Chapter	Publication
022. "Won't Stop Bleeding" (血がとまらない, "Chi ga tomara nai")	Shōnen Champion Comics edition Vol. 3
028. "Finger" (指, "Yubi")	Not published in tankōbon
036. "Sinking Woman" (しずむ女, "Shizumu onna")	Shōnen Champion Comics edition Vol. 4
037. "The Two Jans" (2人のジャン, "Futari o no jan")	Shōnen Champion Comics edition Vol. 4 (Published in Vertical Hardcover ed. vol. 1)
041. "Vegetable" (植物人間, "Shokubutsu ningen")	Shōnen Champion Comics edition Vol. 4 (1st printing)
058. "The Seat of Pleasure" (快楽の座, "Kairaku no za")	Not published in tankōbon
076. "Hydrocephalus" (水頭症, "Suitōshō")	Shōnen Champion Comics edition Vol. 6
128. "The One That Remains" (最後に残る者, "Saigo ni nokoru mono")	Shōnen Champion Comics edition Vol. 13 (Published in Vertical Hardcover ed. vol. 2)
139. "Witch Trial" (魔女裁判, "Majo saiban")	Shōnen Champion Comics edition Vol. 17 (Published in Vertical Hardcover ed. vol. 3)
171. "Wall" (壁, "Kabe")	Akita Top Comics Wide edition Vol. 5
209. "Falling Object" (落下物, "Rakkabutsu")	Akita Top Comics edition Vol. 22

== See also ==
- Black Jack
- List of Black Jack episodes
- List of Osamu Tezuka manga
