= Eisner Award for Best U.S. Edition of International Material—Asia =

American comic book award

- Awarded for: Best U.S. Edition of International Material—Asia
- Country: United States
- Presented by: San Diego Comic-Con
- First award: 2007
- Most recent winner: Purgatory Funeral Cakes by Sanho, translation by Danny Lim
- Website: www.comic-con.org/awards/eisner-awards-current-info

The Eisner Award for Best U.S. Edition of International Material—Asia is an award for given to a comic book originally published in Asia and reprinted for sale in the United States of America. Comics by creators from Japan, South Korea, China, and Singapore have been nominated.

== History and name change ==
Material from Asia was eligible for the Eisner award for Best U.S. Edition of Foreign Material from that award's inception in 1998 to 2006, winning it every year except 2003 and 2006. In 2007 that award was split into Best U.S. Edition of International Material and Best U.S. Edition of International Material–Japan. Starting in 2010 the current name of Best U.S. Edition of International Material—Asia was adopted.

== Winners and nominees ==
Year	Title	Authors	Translators (Note: Translator was not officially listed until 2017.)	Ref.
2000s
2007	Old Boy (Dark Horse Manga)	Garon Tsuchiya and Nobuaki Minegishi		
2007	After School Nightmare (Go! Comi)	Setona Mizushiro		
2007	Antique Bakery (Digital Manga)	Fumi Yoshinaga		
2007	Naoki Urasawa's Monster (Viz Media)	Naoki Urasawa		
2007	The Walking Man (Fanfare/Ponent Mon)	Jiro Taniguchi		
2008	Tekkonkinkreet: Black & White (Viz Media)	Taiyō Matsumoto		
2008	The Ice Wanderer and Other Stories (Fanfare/Ponent Mon)	Jiro Taniguchi		
2008	MW (Vertical)	Osamu Tezuka		
2008	Naoki Urasawa's Monster (Viz Media)	Naoki Urasawa		
2008	New Engineering (PictureBox)	Yuichi Yokoyama		
2008	Town of Evening Calm, Country of Cherry Blossoms (Last Gasp)	Fumiyo Kōno		
2009	Dororo (Vertical)	Osamu Tezuka		
2009	Cat Eyed Boy (Viz Media)	Kazuo Umezu		
2009	Naoki Urasawa's Monster (Viz Media)	Naoki Urasawa		
2009	The Quest for the Missing Girl (Fanfare/Ponent Mon)	Jiro Taniguchi		
2009	Solanin (Viz Media)	Inio Asano		
2010s
2010	A Drifting Life (Drawn & Quarterly)	Yoshihiro Tatsumi		
2010	The Color Trilogy (First Second Books)	Kim Dong Hwa		
2010	A Distant Neighborhood (2 vols.) (Fanfare/Ponent Mon)	Jiro Taniguchi		
2010	Oishinbo a la Carte (Viz Media)	Tetsu Kariya and Akira Hanasaki		
2010	Pluto: Urasawa X Tezuka (Viz Media)	Naoki Urasawa and Takashi Nagasaki	Jared Cook and Frederik L. Schodt	
2010	Naoki Urasawa's 20th Century Boys (Viz Media)	Naoki Urasawa		
2011	Naoki Urasawa's 20th Century Boys (Viz Media)	Naoki Urasawa		
2011	Ayako (Vertical)	Osamu Tezuka		
2011	Bunny Drop (Yen Press)	Yumi Unita		
2011	A Drunken Dream and Other Stories (Fantagraphics)	Moto Hagio	Rachel Thorn	
2011	House of Five Leaves (Viz Media)	Natsume Ono		
2012	Onward Towards Our Noble Deaths (Drawn & Quarterly)	Shigeru Mizuki		
2012	A Bride's Story (Yen Press)	Kaoru Mori		
2012	Drops of God (Vertical)	Tadashi Agi (Shin Kibayashi and Yuko Kibayashi)		
2012	Saturn Apartments, vols. 3-4 (Viz Media)	Hisae Iwaoka		
2012	Stargazing Dog (NBM Publishing)	Takashi Murakami		
2012	Wandering Son, vol. 1 (Fantagraphics)	Takako Shimura	Rachel Thorn	
2013	Naoki Urasawa's 20th Century Boys (Viz Media)	Naoki Urasawa		
2013	Barbara (Digital Manga)	Osamu Tezuka		
2013	A Chinese Life (SelfMadeHero)	Li Kunwu and Philippe Ôtié	Edward Gauvin	
2013	Nonnonba (Drawn & Quarterly)	Shigeru Mizuki		
2013	Thermae Romae (Yen Press/Hachette)	Mari Yamazaki		
2014	The Mysterious Underground Men (PictureBox)	Osamu Tezuka		
2014	The Heart of Thomas (Fantagraphics)	Moto Hagio	Rachel Thorn	
2014	Showa: A History of Japan, 1926–1939 (Drawn & Quarterly)	Shigeru Mizuki		
2014	The Summit of the Gods, vol. 4 (Fanfare/Ponent Mon)	Baku Yumemakura and Jiro Taniguchi		
2014	Utsubora: The Story of a Novelist (Vertical)	Asumiko Nakamura		
2015	Showa: A History of Japan, 1939–1944 and Showa: A History of Japan, 1944–1953 (Drawn & Quarterly)	Shigeru Mizuki		
2015	All You Need Is Kill (Viz Media)	Hiroshi Sakurazaka, Ryosuke Takeuchi, Takeshi Obata, and yoshitoshi ABe		
2015	In Clothes Called Fat (Vertical)	Moyoco Anno		
2015	Master Keaton, vol. 1 (Viz Media)	Naoki Urasawa, Hokusei Katsushika, and Takashi Nagasaki	Pookie Rolf	
2015	One-Punch Man (Viz Media)	ONE and Yusuke Murata		
2015	Wolf Children: Ame & Yuki (Yen Press)	Mamoru Hosoda and Yū		
2016	Showa: A History of Japan, 1953–1989 (Drawn & Quarterly)	Shigeru Mizuki		
2016	Assassination Classroom, vols. 2–7 (Viz Media)	Yūsei Matsui		
2016	A Bride's Story (Yen Press)	Kaoru Mori		
2016	Master Keaton, vols. 2–4 (Viz Media)	Naoki Urasawa, Hokusei Katsushika, and Takashi Nagasaki	John Werry	
2016	A Silent Voice (Kodansha USA)	Yoshitoki Ōima		
2016	Sunny (Viz Media)	Taiyō Matsumoto		
2017	The Art of Charlie Chan Hock Chye (Pantheon Books)	Sonny Liew	(Note: Originally published in English.)	
2017	Goodnight Punpun, vols. 1–4 (Viz Media)	Inio Asano	JN Productions	
2017	orange: The Complete Collection, vols. 1–2 (Seven Seas Entertainment)	Ichigo Takano	Amber Tamosaitis, adaptation by Shannon Fay	
2017	The Osamu Tezuka Story: A Life in Manga and Anime (Stone Bridge Press)	Toshio Ban and Tezuka Productions	Frederik L. Schodt	
2017	Princess Jellyfish, vols. 1–3 (Kodansha USA)	Akiko Higashimura	Sarah Alys Lindholm	
2017	Wandering Island, vol. 1 (Dark Horse Comics)	Kenji Tsuruta	Dana Lewis	
2018	My Brother's Husband, vol. 1 (Pantheon Books)	Gengoroh Tagame	Anne Ishii	
2018	Furari (Fanfare/Ponent Mon)	Jiro Taniguchi	Kumar Sivasubramanian	
2018	Golden Kamuy (Viz Media)	Satoru Noda	Eiji Yasuda	
2018	Otherworld Barbara, vol. 2 (Fantagraphics)	Moto Hagio	Rachel Thorn	
2018	Shiver: Junji Ito Selected Stories (Viz Media)	Junji Ito	Jocelyne Allen	
2019	Tokyo Tarareba Girls (Kodansha USA)	Akiko Higashimura	Steven LeCroy	
2019	Abara: Complete Deluxe Edition (Viz Media)	Tsutomu Nihei	Sheldon Drzka	
2019	Dead Dead Demon's Dededede Destruction (Viz Media)	Inio Asano	John Werry	
2019	Laid-Back Camp (Yen Press)	Afro	Amber Tamosaitis	
2019	My Beijing: Four Stories of Everyday Wonder (Graphic Universe/Lerner Publishing Group)	Nie Jun	Edward Gauvin	
2020s
2020	Cats of the Louvre (Viz Media) (Note: There was a tie between Cats of the Louvre and Witch Hat Atelier in 2020.)	Taiyō Matsumoto	Michael Arias	
2020	Witch Hat Atelier (Kodansha USA)	Kamome Shirahama	Stephen Kohler	
2020	Beastars (Viz Media)	Paru Itagaki	Tomo Kimura	
2020	Grass (Drawn & Quarterly)	Keum Suk Gendry-Kim	Janet Hong	
2020	Magic Knight Rayearth 25th Anniversary Edition (Kodansha USA)	Clamp	Melissa Tanaka	
2020	The Poe Clan (Fantagraphics)	Moto Hagio	Rachel Thorn	
2021	Remina (Viz Media)	Junji Ito	Jocelyne Allen	
2021	I Had That Same Dream Again (Seven Seas Entertainment)	Idumi Kirihara and Yoru Sumino	Beni Axia Conrad	
2021	I Wish I Could Say "Thank You" (Fanfare/Ponent Mon)	Yukari Takinami	Yukari Takeuchi	
2021	A Journal of My Father (Fanfare/Ponent Mon)	Jiro Taniguchi	Kumar Sivasubramanian	
2021	Ping Pong (Viz Media)	Taiyō Matsumoto	Michael Arias	
2021	Spy × Family (Viz Media)	Tatsuya Endo	Casey Loe	
2022	Lovesickness: Junji Ito Story Collection (Viz Media)	Junji Ito	Jocelyne Allen	
2022	Chainsaw Man (Viz Media)	Tatsuki Fujimoto	Amanda Haley	
2022	Kaiju No. 8 (Viz Media)	Naoya Matsumoto	David Evelyn	
2022	Robo Sapiens (Seven Seas Entertainment)	Toranosuke Shimada	Adrienne Beck	
2022	Spy × Family (Viz Media)	Tatsuya Endo	Casey Loe	
2022	Zom 100: Bucket List of the Dead (Viz Media)	Haro Aso and Kotaro Takata	Nova Skipper	
2023	Shuna's Journey (First Second Books)	Hayao Miyazaki	Alex Dudok de Wit	
2023	Black Paradox (Viz Media)	Junji Ito	Jocelyne Allen	
2023	The Hellbound, vols. 1-2 (Dark Horse Comics)	Yeon Sang-ho and Choi Gyu-seok	Danny Lim	
2023	Look Back (Viz Media)	Tatsuki Fujimoto	Amanda Haley	
2023	PTSD Radio, vol. 1 (Kodansha USA)	Masaaki Nakayama	Adam Hirsch	
2023	Talk to My Back (Drawn & Quarterly)	Murasaki Yamada	Ryan Holmberg	
2024	My Picture Diary (Drawn & Quarterly)	Maki Fujiwara	Ryan Holmberg	
2024	#DRCL midnight children (Viz Media)	Shin-ichi Sakamoto	Caleb Cook	
2024	Goodbye, Eri (Viz Media)	Tatsuki Fujimoto	Amanda Haley	
2024	The Horizon (Yen Press)	JH	Ultramedia Co. Ltd.	
2024	River's Edge (Kodansha USA)	Kyoko Okazaki	Alexa Frank	
2024	The Summer Hikaru Died (Yen Press)	Mokumokuren	Ajani Oloye	
2025
2025	Tokyo These Days (Viz Media)	Taiyō Matsumoto	Michael Arias	
2025	Ashita no Joe: Fighting for Tomorrow (Kodansha USA)	Tetsuya Chiba, Asao Takamori	Asa Yonola	
2025	Hereditary Triangle (Yen Press)	Fumiya Hayashi	Alethea Nibley, Athena Nibley	
2025	Kagurabachi (Viz Media)	Takeru Hokazono	Camellia Nieh	
2025	Last Quarter (Viz Media)	Ai Yazawa	Max Greenway	
2025	Search and Destroy (Fantagraphics)	Atsushi Kaneko	Ben Applegate	
2026
2026	Purgatory Funeral Cakes (Dark Horse Comics)	Sanho	Danny Lim	
2026	Hirayasumi (Viz Media)	Keigo Shinzo	Jan Mitsuko Cash	
2026	Land (Yen Press)	Kazumi Yamashita	Kevin Gifford	
2026	Tokyo Alien Bros. (Viz Media)	Keigo Shinzo	Casey Loe	
2026	Yan (Titan Publishing Group)	Chang Sheng	Vanessa Liu	

== See also ==
- Eisner Award for Best U.S. Edition of International Material
- Eisner Award for Best Publication for Early Readers
- Eisner Award for Best Academic/Scholarly Work
