= Senshu University =

Private university in Chiyoda, Tokyo, Japan

Coordinates: 35°41′48.6″N 139°45′13.8″E

- 専修大学
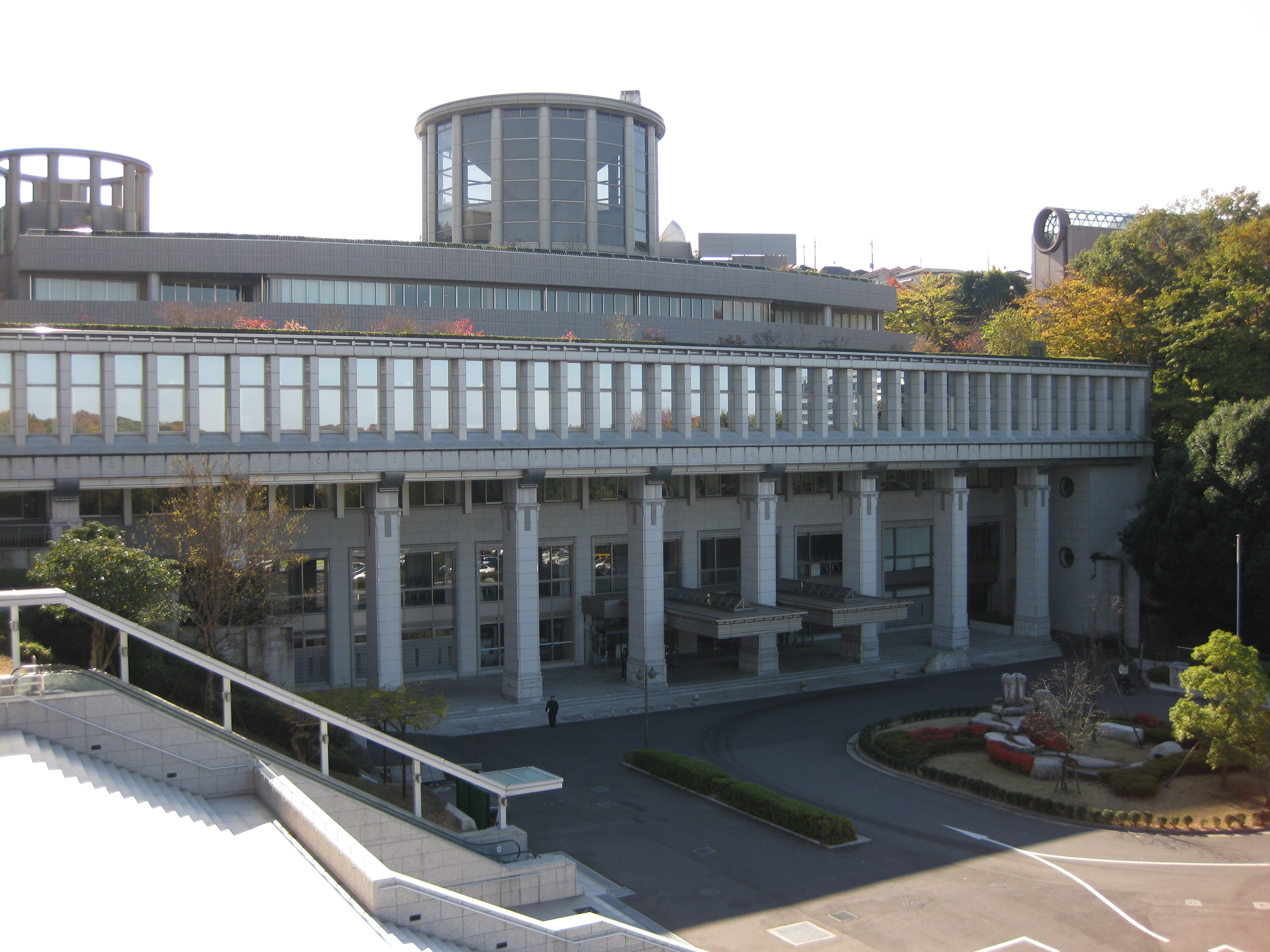
- Senshu University Ikuta Campus
- Motto: 報恩奉仕 (Gratitude and service)
- Type: Private
- Established: 1880; 146 years ago
- President: Yoshihiro Hidaka
- Faculty: 1,139
- Undergraduates: 20,176
- Postgraduates: 484
- Location: Chiyoda, Tokyo, Japan
- Campus: Urban
- Colors
- Mascot: Sendy (センディ)
- Website: www.senshu-u.ac.jp

Senshu University (専修大学, Senshū Daigaku), generally referred to as Senshu (専修) or Sen-Dai (専大), is a private university located in Chiyoda, Tokyo, Japan. Founded in 1880 as Senshu College (専修学校; Senshu Gakko), which was recognised as one of the Five Great Law Schools by four co-founders, it is one of the oldest universities in Japan.

The university has a total of about 20,000 students coming from the Greater Tokyo Area. Senshu is organised into seven undergraduates, five graduates, and one professional graduate school; and twelve research institutes. The university currently has partnerships with 35 universities and institutions in 19 countries. Some of the University's partners include: the University of Bristol (England), the University of Barcelona (Spain), Peking University (China), and the University of Oregon (United States).

Since its founding, Senshu University has sent out about 290,000 graduates, with alumni in diverse fields such as politics, business, culture, entertainment, sports, and mass media. Senshu University alumni include the former Minister of Defence, eleven sitting Diet members, 195 professional athletes, and twenty four company chief executives. As of 2023, 70 Senshu alumni have participated in the Olympic Games and 9 alumni have won medals.

== History ==
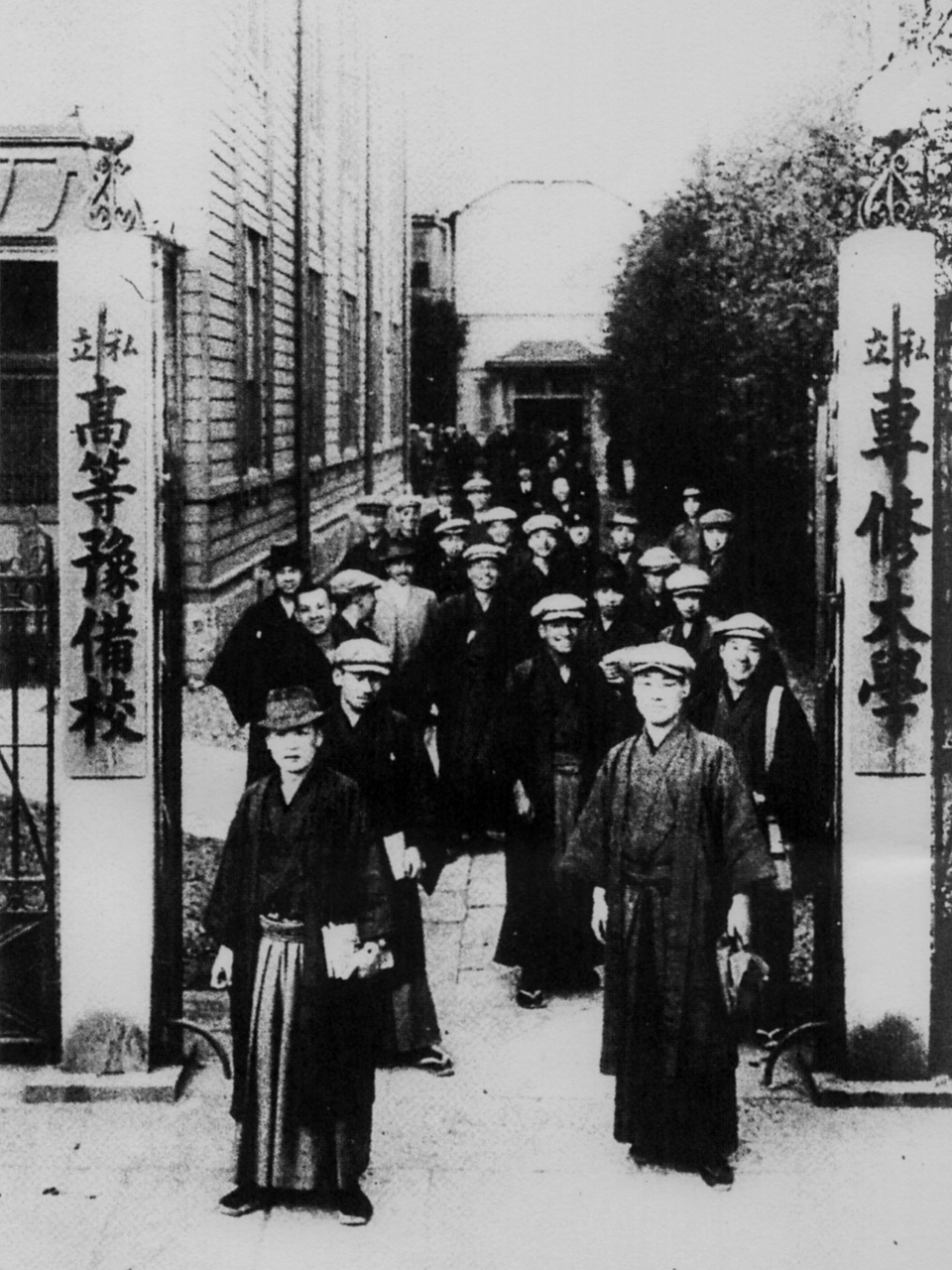
College's main-gate in 1917

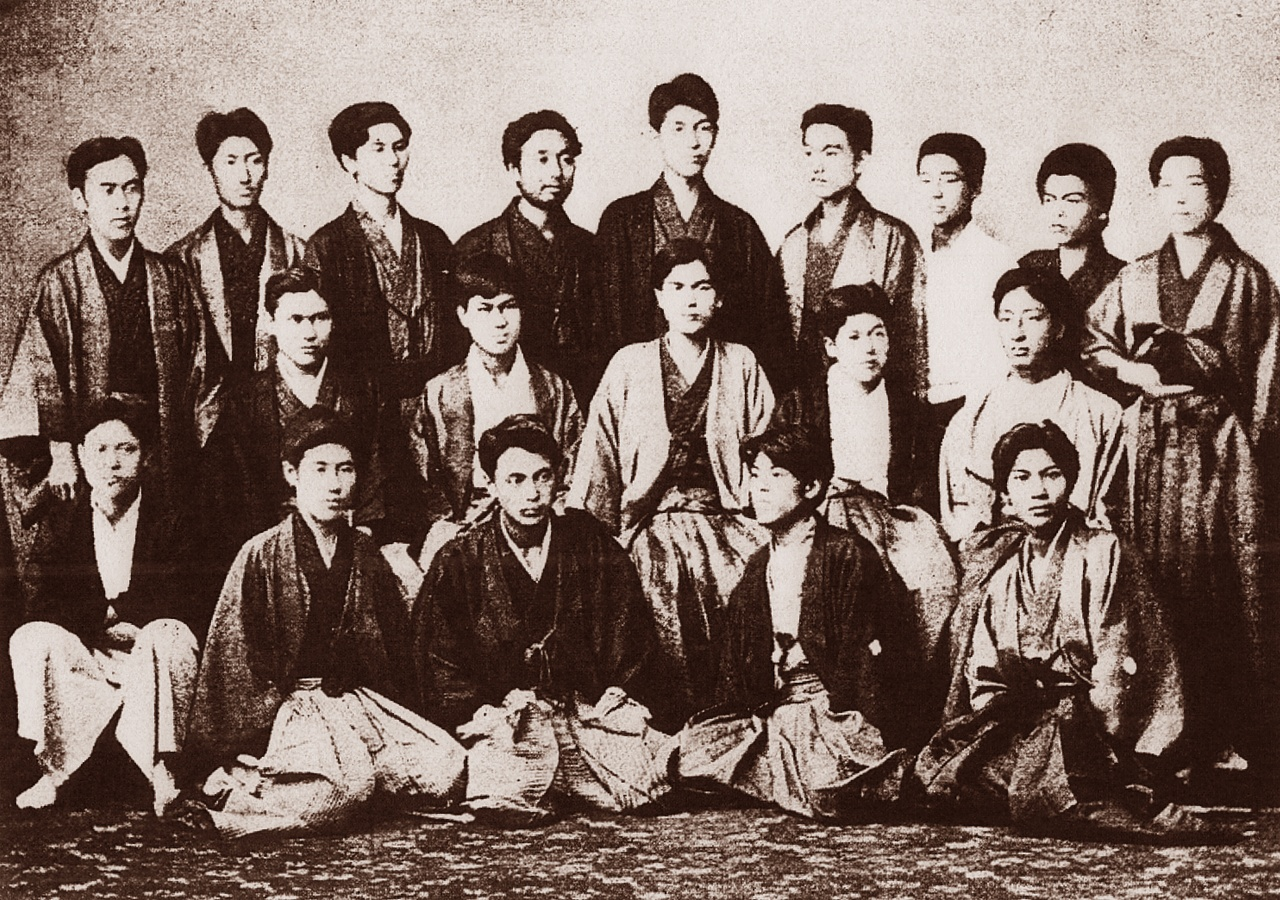
Senshu College 3rd Graduates in 1883

The university was founded in September 1880, as Senshu College by four co-founders: Nagatane Soma, Tanetaro Megata, Inajjiro Taziri and Shigetada Komai.

In the late 19th century, the Meiji government encouraged students to study abroad to gain advanced Western knowledge. With the institution, they all have studied at universities in the United States such as Columbia University (Soma), Harvard University (Megata), Yale University (Soma, Taziri) and Rutgers University (Komai). In 1875, they founded the Japan Law Company in the United States and envisioned the establishment of a new educational institute. In 1879, they received support from Yukichi Fukuzawa and they established the Night Law School in Fukuzawa's Keio-Gijuku. In 1880, the Night Law School became independent of Keio-Gijuku and merged with two private schools to form Senshu College, which was established as an Anglo-American law school and economics school. At that time, there were only a few schools that could teach specialised law, and the University of Tokyo taught law in English and the Ministry of Justice Law School taught law in French. Meanwhile, Senshu was the first college where Japanese teachers taught specialised subjects in the Japanese language, and it was also the first college to establish a school of economics in Japan.

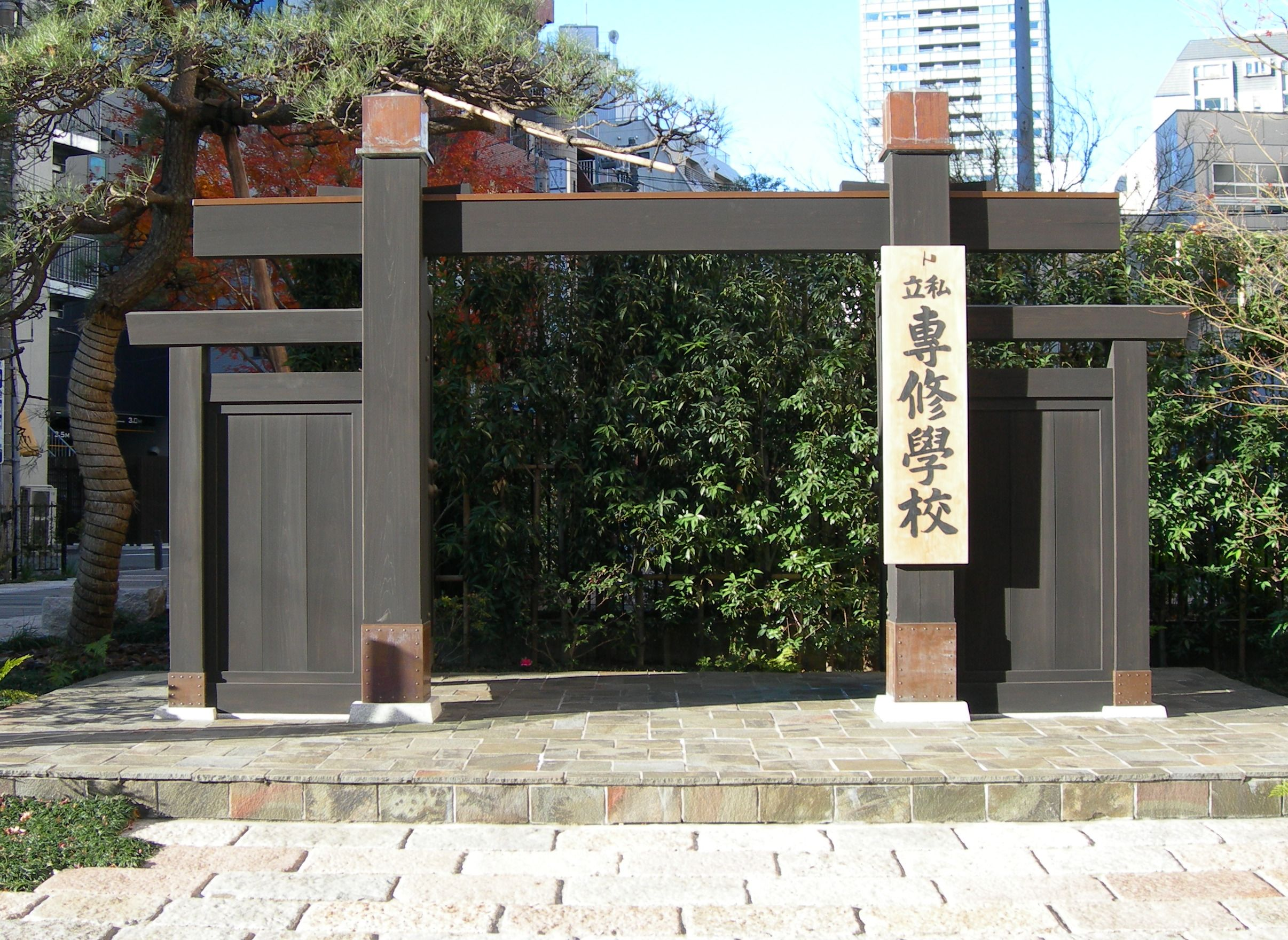
The gate of Kanda campus (Black-gate)

After 1885, Senshu was moved its campus from Ginza to Kanda, and built the Black Gate (黒門 Kuromon), which was reconstructed in 2010 as the Kanda Campus Monument. In 1888, Senshu was recognised as one of the Five Great Law Schools. In 1918, the government enacted the University Establishment Ordinance and eight universities, which including Keio University and Waseda University were approved as a universities in 1920, and Senshu was also approved as a university in 1922. The Kanda campus is located in Kanda-Jinbōchō and formed a college town with Hosei University, Chuo University, Nihon University and Meiji University. After the World War II, Senshu established the Ikuta campus in Kanagawa Prefecture to cope with the increasing number of students. Today, Senshu has grown into a comprehensive university with 7 undergraduates, 5 graduates, 1 professional graduate school. In 2010, Senshu declared 'Development of Social Intelligence' as its vision for the 21st century.

Four co-founders of Senshu College

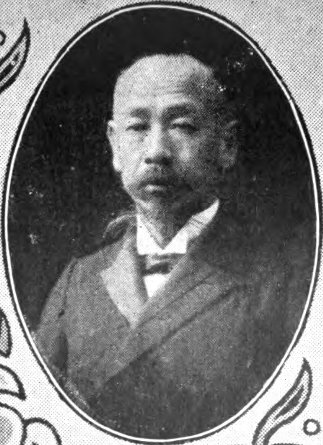
Nagatane Soma

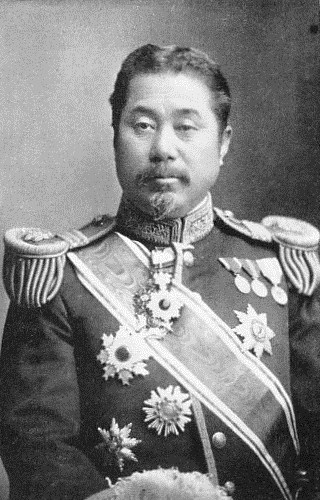
Tanetaro Megata

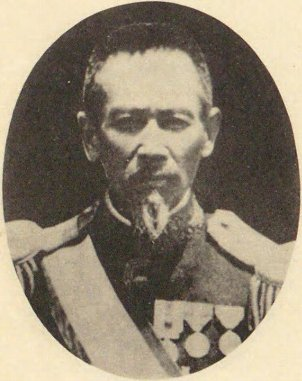
Inajiro Tajiri

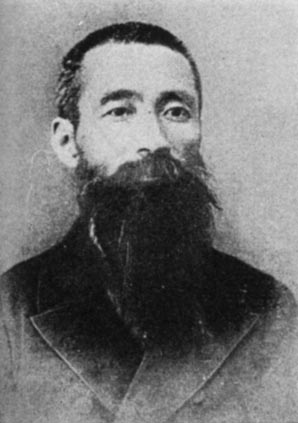
Komai Shigetada

== Campuses and institutions ==
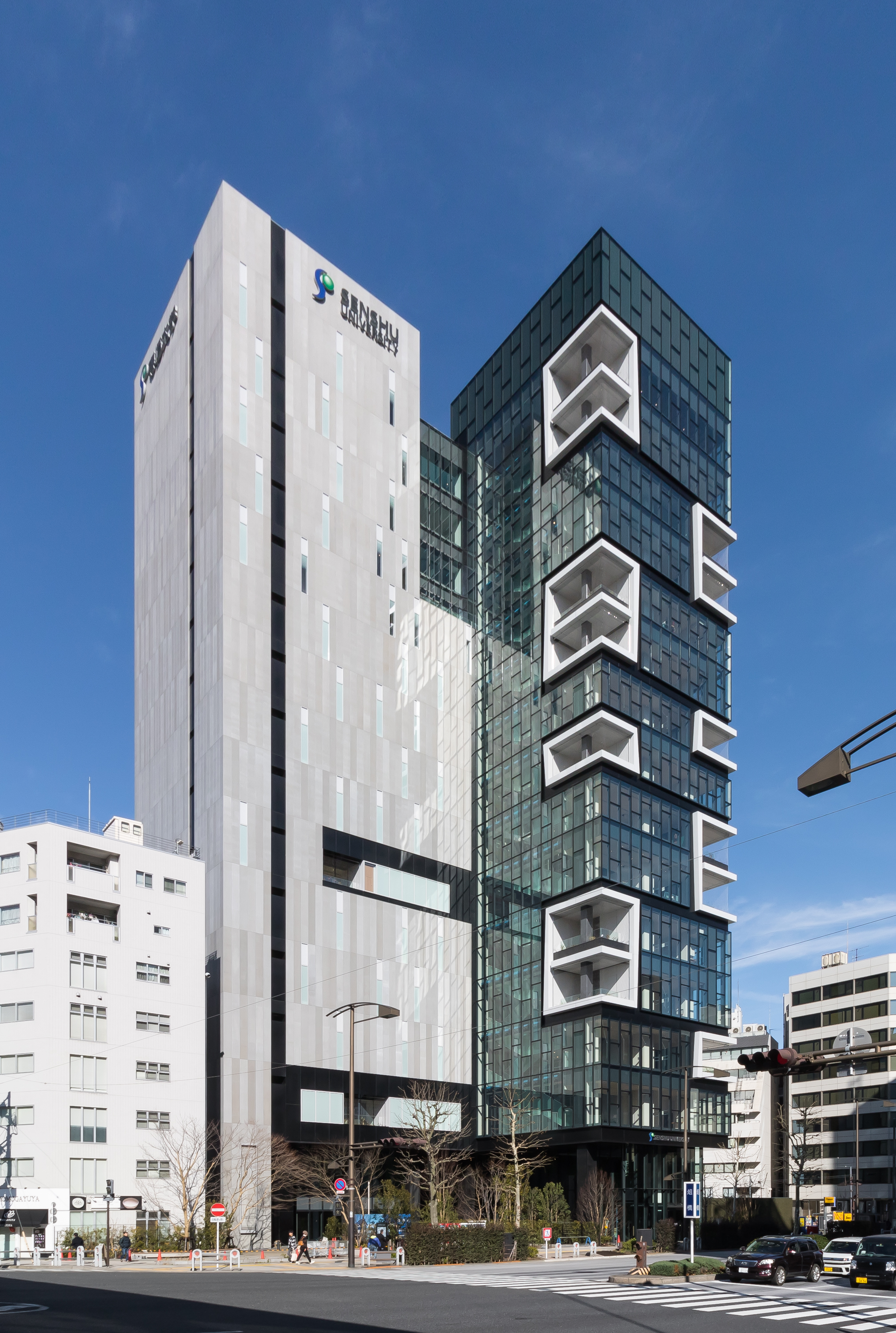
Senshu University Kanda Campus Building 10

- Kanda Campus (Main campus): 3–8 Kandajimbo-cho, Chiyoda, Tokyo 101-8425 The Kanda Campus is situated in Jimbocho, a college community in central Tokyo and near by the Imperial Palace and The National Diet Building. This urban campus consists of several buildings, including the newly established Law School.
- Ikuta Campus: 2–1–1 Higashi-mita, Tama-ku, Kawasaki, Kanagawa 214-8580 The Ikuta Campus is the largest and the most populous campus of Senshu University. The campus is located on a hill between Tama Hills and Ikuta Ryokuchi Park.
- Satellite Campus: Atlas Tower Mukogaoka Yuen, 2nd floor 2130-2 Noborito, Tama-ku, Kawasaki, Kanagawa 214-0014 This campus is used for open lectures.
- Isehara General Ground: 163 Nishitomioka, Isehara, Kanagawa 259–1111 Facilities for each sports club, riding stables, student dormitories, etc.

== Organization ==
=== Undergraduate faculties ===
==== Daytime divisions ====
- School of Economics
  - Department of Economics
  - Department of Economics for Life and Social Environment
  - Department of International Economics
- School of Law
  - Department of Law
  - Department of Politics
- School of Business Administration
  - Department of Business Design
  - Department of Business Administration
- School of Commerce
  - Department of Marketing
  - Department of Accounting
- School of Letters
  - Department of Japanese Literature and Culture
  - Department of English
  - Department of Philosophy
  - Department of History
  - Department of Geography
  - Department of Liberal Arts and Journalism
- School of Human Sciences
  - Department of Psychology
  - Department of Sociology
- School of Network and Information
  - Department of Network and Information
- School of International Communication
  - Department of Japanese Language and Linguistics
  - Department of Intercultural Communication

==== Evening divisions ====
- School of Economics
  - Department of Economics
- School of Law
  - Department of Law
- School of Commerce
  - Department of Marketing

=== Graduate schools ===
- Graduate School of Economics
- Graduate School of Law
- Graduate School of Humanities
- Graduate School of Business Administration
- Graduate School of Commerce

=== Professional schools ===
- Law school

=== Research institutes ===
- Institute for Social Sciences
- Institute for Accounting Studies
- Imamura Institute of Legal Studies
- Institute of Business Administration
- Institute for Commercial Sciences
- Institute for the Humanities
- Law Institute
- Institute of Sports, Physical Education and Recreation
- Institute of Information Science
- Institute of Natural Sciences
- Psychological Counseling Center
- Institute for Development of Social Intelligence

== Notable graduates ==
=== Politicians ===
- Tokuo Yamashita (Minister of Transport, Chief Cabinet Secretary, was Minister of Health, Labour, and Welfare)
- Yasukazu Hamada (Minister of Defense)
- Hiroshi Hase (Minister of Education, Culture, Sports, Science and Technology, professional wrestler (1986–2006))
- Hideo Higashikokubaru (Governor of Miyazaki)

=== Art ===
- Futabatei Shimei (author)
- Tetsurō Araki (animation director)
- Atsushi Kaneko (manga artist (Known for Bambi and Her Pink Gun, Soil))

=== Sports ===
- Kento Sugiyama (baseball player)
- Hiroki Kuroda (baseball player)
- Yuya Hasegawa (baseball player)
- Tetsuya Matsumoto (baseball player)
- Hideko Hiranaka (medley swimmer)
- Wataru Murata (rugby player and coach)
- Ryo Adachi (football player and manager)
- Jun Wada (football player)
- Takuya Ito (football player)
- Takumi Nagura (football player)
- Kazuki Nagasawa (football player)
- Teruhito Nakagawa (football player)
- Tadaharu Ogawa (basketball player)
- Takashi Sato (mixed martial artist)
- Keito Yamakita (mixed martial artist)
- Haruhisa Chiba (skier)

== Agreements with other universities ==
- Participant in the Kanda 5 Universities
  - Senshu University
  - Chuo University
  - Hosei University
  - Meiji University
  - Nihon University
- Tokyo 12 Universities
  - Senshu University
  - Aoyama Gakuin University
  - Chuo University
  - Hosei University
  - Keio University
  - Kokugakuin University
  - Meiji University
  - Nihon University
  - Sophia University
  - Rikkyo University (Saint Paul's University)
  - Tokai University
  - Waseda University
- Participant in the Chiyoda Universities
  - Senshu University
  - Otsuma Women's University
  - Kyoritsu Women's University
  - Sophia University
  - Tokyo Kaseigakuin College
  - Tokyo Denki University
  - Nishogakusha University
  - Nihon University
  - Nippon Dental University
  - Hosei University
  - Meiji University
- Participant in the Tama-ku, Kawasaki 3 Universities
  - Senshu University
  - Meiji University
  - Japan Women's University

== Sister schools ==
=== United States ===
- University of Nebraska–Lincoln
- Susquehanna University
- University of Illinois at Urbana–Champaign
- University of Oregon

=== Canada ===
- University of Calgary

=== Mexico ===
- Universidad Iberoamericana

=== United Kingdom ===
- University of Bristol

=== Ireland ===
- Trinity College Dublin

=== France ===
- Lumière University Lyon 2

=== Germany ===
- Martin Luther University of Halle-Wittenberg

=== Spain ===
- University of Barcelona

=== Australia ===
- University of Technology, Sydney
- University of Wollongong

=== New Zealand ===
- University of Waikato

=== South Korea ===
- Dankook University

=== China ===
- Shanghai University
- Northwest University
- Peking University

=== Taiwan ===
- National Sun Yat-sen University

=== Mongolia ===
- National University of Mongolia

=== Vietnam ===
- National Economics University

== Language training institutes ==
- Institut de Touraine, France
- Goethe-Institut Bremen, Germany
- Yonsei University Korean Language Institute, South Korea
- CIE Oxford, United Kingdom

== Affiliated schools ==
The university is affiliated with the following schools and universities in Japan.

- Ishinomaki Senshu University (Miyagi Prefecture)
- Hokkaido College, Senshu University (Hokkaido)
- Senshu University High School (Tokyo)
- Senshu University Matsudo High School and Junior High School (Chiba Prefecture)
- Senshu University Kitakami High School (Iwate Prefecture)
- Senshu University Tamana High School (Kumamoto Prefecture)
