= Jean Giraud bibliography =

Jean Giraud, aka "Mœbius", was a French artist, cartoonist, and writer who worked in the Franco-Belgian bandes dessinées (BD) tradition. This page lists the comic album (not to be confused with comic book) and book (print) releases in which his work has been published with emphasis on those works that have been published in English translation.

== Books and comic albums ==
Note: those works for which English translations have been published are noted as such. Their respective pages describe this further, and/or is detailed in section § English editions.

=== French editions ===
==== As Gir/Jean Giraud ====
- Comic albums and series
  - Blueberry (29 vol., 1965–2007, partial English translation), artist (all vol), (co-)writer vol 24–29 (writer vol. 1–24: Jean Michel Charlier)
  - La Jeunesse de Blueberry (Young Blueberry, 1968–1970, vol. 1–3, English translation), artist (writer: Jean Michel Charlier)
  - Gir (The detour, one-shot, comic/artbook hybrid, 1974, English translation), writer and artist
  - Jason Muller: Récits des temps post-atomiques ! (one-shot, 1975), writer second part & stand-alone short (artist: Claude Auclair, writer first part: Linus)
  - Jim Cutlass (7 vol., 1979–1999, vol. 1 English translation), artist vol. 1 (writer: Jean Michel Charlier), writer vol. 2–7 (artist: Christian Rossi)
  - Gir œuvres T1: Le lac des émeraudes (short stories collection, partially in English translation, 1980), (co-)writer and artist
  - La ferme de animaux (one-shot, 1985), writer (artist: Marc Bati)
  - Marshal Blueberry (3 vol., 1991–2000), writer (artist vol. 1–2: William Vance, artist vol. 3: Michel Rouge)
  - XIII 18: La Version irlandaise (2007, The Irish Version, English translation), artist (writer: Jean van Hamme)
- Artbooks
  - Gir œuvres T2: Le tireur solitaire (1983), artist
  - Blueberry's (1997), artist
- Illustrated books
  - Hommes et cavernes: nos ancêtres il y a 20,000 ans (1957), co-artist (writer: Francois Desprez, co-artist: Guy Mouminoux)
  - Sept filles dans la brousse (1958), (cover-)artist for French edition (writer: Phyllis M. Power, originally a 1955 Blackie & Son Ltd, London publication as Under Australian Skies)
  - Amérique an mille (1959), cover and co-artist (writer: G. Travelier, co-artist: Guy Mouminoux)
  - L'histoire des civilisations (vol. 1–4, 1961–1963), unsigned co-artist (writer[s]: Hachette editors, co-artist: Jean-Claude Mézières)
  - Buffalo Bill: le roi des éclaireurs (1968, Buffalo Bill, Scout and Frontiersman, English translation), cover and interior co-artist (writer: George Fronval, co-artist: Jean Marcellin)
  - Olivier chez Les Cow-Boys (1969), artist (writer: Pierre Christin, photo illustrator: Jean-Claude Mézières)
  - La Fleur du désert (Goldenrod, originally in English, 1976), cover artist (writer: Herbert Harker)
  - Morgan Kane (vol. 1–7, English translations, but not the by Giraud cover illustrated 1979 French editions), cover artist (writer: Louis Masterson)
  - L'univers de Gir (1986), cover and interior co-artist (writers and co-artists: several)

==== As Mœbius ====
- Comic albums & series
  - Le Bandard fou (1974, The Horny Goof, English translation), writer and artist
  - Arzach (1976, English translation), writer and artist
  - Cauchemar blanc (1974, White nightmare, English translation), writer and artist
  - John Watercolor et sa redingote qui tue !! (1977, The Early Mœbius & Other Humorous Stories, English translation), writer and artist
  - L'Homme est-il bon ? (1977, Is Man Good?, English translation), writer and artist, including: The Long Tomorrow (1976, French original despite English title, English translation), artist (writer: Dan O'Bannon)
  - Le Garage Hermétique (1976–1980, The Airtight Garage, English translation), writer and artist
  - Les Yeux du Chat (1978, The Eyes of the Cat, English translation), artist (writer: Alejandro Jodorowsky)
  - Tueur de monde (1979), writer and artist
  - La Déviation (1980, The Detour, English translation), artist and (co-)writer (co-writer: Claudine Conin)
  - l'Incal (1981–1988, The Incal, 6 vol., English translation), artist (writer: Alejandro Jodorowsky)
  - Les Maîtres du temps (1982), (co-)writer (co-writer: René Laloux)
  - Le Monde d'Édena (1983–2001, The World of Edena, 6 vol., English translation), writer and artist
  - La Nuit de l'étoile (1986), writer and artist (co-writer: Jean-Paul Appel-Guéry; co-artist: Marc Bati)
  - Altor (1986–2003, The Magic Crystal, 7 vol., English translation vol. 1–3), writer (artist: Marc Bati)
  - Silver Surfer: Parable (originally in English, 1988–1989), artist (writer: Stan Lee)
  - Escale sur Pharagonescia (1989, Pharagonesia, English translation), writer and artist
  - Le Prince impensable (originally in English, 1990), writer (artist: Eric Shanower)
  - Silence, on rêve (1991), writer and co-artist (co-artists: various), including Marie Dakar (Marie Dakar, English translation), writer and artist
  - Les Vacances du Major (1992), writer and artist
  - Le Cœur couronné (1992, Madwoman of the Sacred Heart, 3 vol., English translation), artist (writer: Alejandro Jodorowsky)
  - Little Nemo (vol. 1–2, 1994–1995), writer (artist: Bruno Marchand)
  - L'Homme du Ciguri (1995, The Man from the Ciguri, English translation), writer and artist
  - 40 Days dans le Désert B (1999, no English edition, but as a text-less graphic novel intended for international release), writer and artist
  - Après l'Incal (2000, vol. 1: Le Nouveau Rêve, English translation), artist (writer: Alejandro Jodorowsky)
  - Inside Mœbius (2000–2010, 6 vol., English translation), writer and artist
  - Icare (2000, Icaro, originally in Japanese, 2 vol., English translation), writer (artist: Jirô Taniguchi)
  - The Halo Graphic Novel (originally in English, Chapter 4: Second Sunrise over New Mombasa, 2006), artist (writer: Brett Lewis)
  - Le Chasseur Déprime (2008, The Depressed Hunter, English translation), writer and artist
  - Arzak L'Arpenteur (2010), writer and artist
  - Le Major (2011, The Major, English translation), writer and artist
- Artbooks
  - Mœbius 30 x 30 (1980), writer and artist
  - Moebius œuvres complètes T4: La Complainte de l'Homme Programme (1982), writer and artist
  - La Mémoire du futur (1983), writer and artist
  - Moebius œuvres complètes T5: Le Désintégré Réintégré (1984), writer and artist
  - Venise céleste (1984), writer and artist
  - Made in L.A. (1988), writer and artist
  - Quatre-vingt huit (1990), writer and artist
  - Chaos (English translation, 1991), writer and artist
  - Chroniques métalliques (1992, Metallic Memories, English translation), writer and artist
  - Griffes d'Ange (1994, Angel Claw, English translation), artist (writer: Alejandro Jodorowsky)
  - Fusions (1995, Fusion, English translation), writer and artist
  - Moebius transe forme (2010), artist
  - La Faune de Mars (2011), writer and artist
  - Lazlo Parker : Œuvres Monumentales Miniatures (2020), writer and artist
  - Arzak Artbook (2023, bi-lingual: French/English), artist
  - Lézards rêveurs (2025), writer and artist
- Illustrated books
  - La parapsychologie et vous (1980), artist (writer: Paula Salomon)
  - Les Mystères de l'Incal (1989, Deconstructing The Incal, English translation), artist (writers: Jean Annestay, Alejandro Jodorowsky)
  - Les Histoires de Monsieur Mouche (1994), artist (writer: Jean-Luc Coudray)
  - L'Alchimiste (1994, The Illustrated Alchemist, English translation), artist (writer: Paulo Coelho)
  - Ballades (1995), artist (writer: François Villon)
  - La Divina Commedia: Paradiso (1999), artist (writer: Dante Alighieri)
  - 2001 Après Jésus Christ (2000), artist (writer: Jean-Luc Coudray)
  - La Mémoire de l'âme (2001), artist (writer: Jean-Jacques Launier)

=== English editions ===
Notes: for particulars on the English-language Blueberry publications, please refer to main article; corresponding digital releases are not included for expediency; where available, links to the Grand Comics Database provided for detailed content descriptions of the individual short story collections.

With the below referenced posthumous publishing efforts of Dark Horse Books that started in 2016, Giraud has become, along with fellow artist Enki Bilal from his Métal hurlant days, one of the relatively few European graphic novel artists to have the bulk of their body of work translated in the English language.

==== HM Communications ====
The English-language versions of many of Mœbius' comics have been collected into various editions, beginning with a small series of US graphic novel sized trade paperbacks from HM Communications, Inc., collecting work originally published in its Heavy Metal magazine (the US version of the French original, co-founded by Giraud), and in which Moebius' work was introduced to American readership in the 1970s. It has been noted by Taboo Editor-in-Chief Stephen R. Bissette that the quality of the HM Communications translations had been very poor.

Heavy Metal presents (1977–1981)

- Arzach (64 pages, HM Communications, 1977, ISBN 0930368886); also collects the first time US publication of the above-mentioned single left hand panels of the "transformation" sequence as originally published in the 1974 "Le bandard fou" album.
- Is Man Good? (64 pages, HM Communications, 1978, ISBN 0930368924)
- Moebius (96 pages, HM Communications, 1981, OCLC 9043362, issued without ISBN); art/comic album hybrid with an introduction by Federico Fellini, featuring a selection of art lifted from the French 1980 "Mœbius" source art book, and the entirety of the first volume of the Incal series, "The Black Incal", therefore constituting the first English-language book release of the series.

==== Marvel/Epic ====
A far more comprehensive effort was undertaken at Marvel Comics under its "Epic Comics" imprint in the late 1980s and early 1990s, initiated, translated and introduced by Jean-Marc and Randy Lofficier. The intent was to collect all comics Giraud had hitherto published in Europe as Mœbius into one single format collection, and in this Epic largely succeeded, when the eventual two – three when counting Blueberry as well – collections had run their courses around 1992. Margaret C. Clark served as the collection project manager, though she left Marvel before the collection had run its course. When initiated, the collections were otherwise unaltered published in Great Britain as well, with a lag ranging from a few months to a year, by Titan Books in a smaller print run of 6.000 copies per title – like the previous HM Communications book releases had been – as opposed to the initial 20.000 copies per title release by Epic with a continuous reprint option for those volumes selling out while the Epic publication effort was underway, a relative novelty in the US comic world at the time. However, of the eventual eleven titles in the Fantasies softcover collection, only six (Mœbius 1 - Mœbius 6) were ultimately released by Titan Books. With the exception of Mœbius 9 – Stel (itself a very late addition to the Fantasies collection, being a near simultaneous international 1994 release), Giraud created new cover art for the Marvel/Epic releases, including the Incal (and Blueberry) series. Save for Mœbius 1/2 and aside from the covers, it was for the Fantasies collection that stories originally done in black & white in the French source publications, received first time coloring, most notably The Airtight Garage, but excepting the seminal short story "The Detour". Remarkably, Epic was aided by outsiders Dark Horse Comics and Graphitti Designs, who each added a volume to the Fantasies collection, adhering to the style and format as set by Epic, in which work was published Marvel/Epic itself apparently deemed too controversial to publish themselves, particularly the 0-volume for its heavy, albeit humorous, phallic theme.

Though some purist fans have frowned upon the coloring of the originally black & white stories, the Marvel/Epic Fantasies collection has nevertheless served as the template for similar collections subsequently released in not only native France, but in other countries as well.

Cover of the 1987 US Epic edition of Mœbius 3: The Airtight Garage

The Collected Fantasies of Jean Giraud (1987–1994):

- Mœbius 0 – The Horny Goof & Other Underground Stories (72 pages, Dark Horse Comics, June 1990, ISBN 1878574167)
- Mœbius 1/2 – The Early Mœbius & Other Humorous Stories (60 pages, Graphitti Designs, 1992, ISBN 0936211288); black & white, expanded English-language version of "John Watercolor et sa redingote qui tue!!"
- Mœbius 1 – Upon A Star (72 pages, Marvel/Epic, September 1987, ISBN 0871352788; Titan, 1988, ISBN 1852860448)
- Mœbius 2 – Arzach & Other Fantasy Stories (72 pages, Marvel/Epic, April 1987, ISBN 0871352796)
- Mœbius 3 – The Airtight Garage (120 pages, Marvel/Epic, April 1987, ISBN 087135280X; Titan, January 1990, ISBN 1852860464)
- Mœbius 4 – The Long Tomorrow & Other Science Fiction Stories (70 pages, Marvel/Epic, 1987, ISBN 0871352818; Titan, February 1988, ISBN 185286043X)
- Mœbius 5 – The Gardens of Aedena (72 pages, Marvel/Epic, 1988, ISBN 0871352826; Titan, 1988, ISBN 1852860472)
- Mœbius 6 – Pharagonesia & Other Strange Stories (72 pages, Marvel/Epic, June 1987, ISBN 0871352834; Titan, June 1988, ISBN 1852860480)
- Mœbius 7 – The Goddess (88 pages, Marvel/Epic, October 1990, ISBN 0871357143)
- Mœbius 8 – Mississippi River (64 pages, Marvel/Epic, January 1991, ISBN 0871357151)
- Mœbius 9 – Stel (80 pages, Marvel/Epic, 1994, ISBN 0785100202); executed in the European standard A4 comic album format as opposed to the smaller American graphic novel format hitherto employed.

The Incal collection (1988)
Mœbius' magnum opus as such, The Incal, was separately released both in the US and Great Britain in its own mini series, each title collecting two of the original French source publications:

- The Incal 1 (96 pages, Marvel/Epic, July 1988, ISBN 0871354365; Titan, 1988, ISBN 1852861061)
- The Incal 2 (118 pages, Marvel/Epic, 1988, ISBN 0871354373; Titan, October 1988, ISBN 185286107X)
- The Incal 3 (96 pages, Marvel/Epic, September 1988, ISBN 0871354381; Titan, November 1988, ISBN 1852861088)

The Marvel/Epic graphic novel releases earned Giraud his three Harvey Awards in the category "Best American Edition of Foreign Material" in 1988 (for the Fantasies collection), in 1989 (for The Incal collection) and in 1991 (for the Blueberry collection).

Cover for the 1998 trade paperback edition of Silver Surfer: Parable

The Silver Surfer (1988–2022)
This miniseries won Giraud his Eisner Award for best finite/limited series in 1989, each comic book issue enjoying a print run of 200,000 copies.

- The Silver Surfer, Part 1 (32 pages, Epic, December 1988); US standard comic book.
- The Silver Surfer, Part 2 (32 pages, Epic, January 1989); US standard comic book.
- The Silver Surfer (68 pages, Epic, December 1988, ISBN 0871354918); with new cover and editorial enhanced, limited deluxe hardcover anthology edition in dust jacket, though print run is unknown.
- The Silver Surfer: Parable (68 pages, Marvel, 1998/Q1, ISBN 0785106561); softcover trade paperback reissue.
- The Silver Surfer: Parable (168 pages, Marvel, May 2012, ISBN 9780785162094); hardcover trade edition, augmented with work from Keith Pollard, concurrently released as a numbered, limited to 640 copies, hardcover edition in dust jacket (ISBN 9780785162100).
- The Silver Surfer: Parable (88 pages, Marvel, July 2019, ISBN 9781302918743); hardcover "30th Anniversary Oversized Edition".
- The Silver Surfer: Parable (88 pages, Marvel, July 2020, ISBN 9781302923709); 30th anniversary softcover trade paperback reissue.
- Silver Surfer Epic Collection: Parable (504 pages, June 2022, Marvel, ISBN 9781302932329); trade paperback anthology collection by several artists and in which the Mœbius creation is included.

Art Books (1989–1995)
In between, Epic Comics did release four stand-alone art book titles, with Chaos and Metallic Memories reproducing most of the 1980 original:

- The Art of Mœbius (96 pages, Epic/Byron Preiss, October 1989, ISBN 0871356104); softcover US graphic novel format, collecting a selection of art previously published in the French source publications, including "La memoire du futur", but – being otherwise an American initiative – it does not adhere to either the content or size format of the source publications, rather featuring artist's annotations on each piece of artwork. Foreword by George Lucas.
- Chaos (96 pages, Epic, November 1991, ISBN 0871358336); hardcover book in deviant 30x30cm format issued without dust jacket, faithful reproduction of the French source publication.
- Metallic Memories (88 pages, Epic, November 1992, ISBN 0871358344); hardcover book in deviant 30x30cm format issued without dust jacket, faithful reproduction of the French source publication.
- Fusion (126 pages, Epic, 1995, ISBN 0785101551); oversized European graphic novel format hardcover book issued without dust jacket, faithful reproduction of the French source publication.

The Elsewhere Prince (1990)
While Giraud (with Lofficier) was only the co-writer of this US standard comic book mini series, which took place in "The Airtight Garage" universe, there was additional art from him featured in short accompanying editorials, as well as one to two page short stories.

- Sonnet 1: The Jouk (32 pages, Epic, May 1990)
- Sonnet 2: The Princess (32 pages, Epic, June 1990)
- Sonnet 3: Abagoo (32 pages, Epic, July 1990)
- Sonnet 4: The Prince (32 pages, Epic, August 1990)
- Sonnet 5: The Bouch' Tarhai (32 pages, Epic, September 1990)
- Sonnet 6: The Artist (32 pages, Epic, October 1990)

Onyx Overlord (1992–1993)
By Giraud co-written sequel to The Elsewhere Prince, and like that series, also featuring additional art from his hand. While Giraud was very pleased with Shanower's art for The Elsewhere Prince for its "naive qualities" he found very fitting for the story-arc, he was deeply disappointed with Bingham's art for Onyx Overlord, considering the work of the "old comics veteran" uninspired and "truly undignified", suspecting Bingham did not like the work. Because of this, Giraud decided not to dispatch the already completed scenarios for Logs 5 and 6. Disappointing sales of the European editions left the cycle uncompleted indefinitely.

- Log 1: Armjourth (32 pages, Epic, October 1992)
- Log 2: Randomearth Yby (32 pages, Epic, November 1992)
- Log 3: Onyx (32 pages, Epic, December 1992)
- Log 4: Return to Armjourth (32 pages, Epic, January 1993)

Moebius' Airtight Garage (1993)
Standard US comic book reissue of the 1987 graphic novel, with some additional art in the editorials.

- Volume 1 (32 pages, Epic, July 1993)
- Volume 2 (32 pages, Epic, August 1993)
- Volume 3 (32 pages, Epic, September 1993)
- Volume 4 (32 pages, Epic, October 1993)

The Halo Graphic Novel (2006)
Comprising four chapters, Giraud provided the 16-page art for chapter 4, "Second Sunrise over New Mombasa". In the editorial of the novel (p. 99), Giraud explained that son Raphaël's enjoyment of the game series ultimately compelled him to accept an invitation to contribute his art; before penciling the story, he had never played the video games.

- The Halo Graphic Novel (128 pages, Marvel, August 2006, ISBN 9780785123729); hardcover in dust jacket, US graphic novel format
- Halo Graphic Novel (128 pages, Marvel, June 2010, ISBN 9780785123781); softcover trade paperback, US graphic novel format

==== Graphitti Designs ====
Excepting The Art of Mœbius, Mœbius 9, Fusion (being Johnny-come-lately's, the latter two were released too late for inclusion, whereas the first one, having been a co-publication, could not for copyright reasons), The Silver Surfer and The Elsewhere Prince/Onyx Overlord, all these volumes were very shortly thereafter reissued by Graphitti Designs – having themselves added a volume to the Collected Fantasies series – as part of their signed and numbered, "Limited Hardcover Edition" 1500 copy each collection (in dust jacket), combining these with the similar Blueberry releases by Epic and Catalan Communications, in a single "Mœbius" ten-volume complete works anthology release. Excepting the last volume, the Mœbius collection was executed in the standard European graphic novel size. The "Young Blueberry" and "Virtual Meltdown" anthology titles differed from the others in that they were not printed on high gloss paper, but on matte paper as in the original ComCat/Epic publications, and was in itself a stark indication – aside from the very quick release after the original Marvel/Epic/ComCat individual publications – that the Graphitti Designs release had always been foreseen, resulting in that the original print run of the interior pages for the individual volumes had already accounted for inclusion in the anthology collection as well.

Mœbius anthology collection (1988–1993)

- Limited Hardcover Edition 12 - Mœbius 1 (272 pages, Graphitti Designs, July 1987, ISBN 0936211105); collects Moebius 1 - 3
- Limited Hardcover Edition 13 - Mœbius 2 (220 pages, Graphitti Designs, 1988, ISBN 0936211113); collects Moebius 4 - 6
- Limited Hardcover Edition 14 - Mœbius 3; The Incal (312 pages, Graphitti Designs, 1988, ISBN 0936211121); collects the Marvel/Epic Incal series
- Limited Hardcover Edition 22 - Mœbius 4; Blueberry (240 pages, Graphitti Designs, 1989, ISBN 0936211202); collects the Marvel/Epic Blueberry series
- Limited Hardcover Edition 23 - Mœbius 5; Blueberry (240 pages, Graphitti Designs, 1990, ISBN 0936211210); collects the Marvel/Epic Blueberry series
- Limited Hardcover Edition 24 - Mœbius 6; Young Blueberry (168 pages, Graphitti Designs, 1990, ISBN 0936211229); collects the ComCat Young Blueberry series
- Limited Hardcover Edition 35 - Mœbius 7 (220 pages, Graphitti Designs, 1990, ISBN 0936211334); collects Moebius 0,1/2 and 7
- Limited Hardcover Edition 36 - Mœbius 8; Blueberry (240 pages, Graphitti Designs, 1991, ISBN 0936211350); collects the Marvel/Epic Blueberry series
- Limited Hardcover Edition 37 - Mœbius 9; Blueberry (180 pages, Graphitti Designs, 1991, ISBN 0936211350); collects the Marvel/Epic Blueberry series & Moebius 8; erroneous use of the same ISBN as the previous volume
- Limited Hardcover Edition 44 - Virtual Meltdown: Images of Mœbius (188 pages, Graphitti Designs, 1993, ISBN 0936211385); collects Chaos and Metallic Memories; issued without dust jacket in deviant 30x30cm format

==== Dark Horse ====
The Abyss (1989)
This mini comic book series, is the comic adaptation of the eponymous movie. The eight-page editorials in each are dedicated to the production design art Giraud had provided for the movie.

- The Abyss, issue 1 (32 pages, Dark Horse Comics, June 1989)
- The Abyss, issue 2 (32 pages, Dark Horse Comics, July 1989)

Concrete (1990)
This special in the Concrete comic book series, featured the first time, full color publication of the 23-page short story "The Still Planet", set in the Edena universe. Accounting for half the contents of the comic book, the story was instrumental in making Mœbius co-winner of the 1991 Eisner Award in the category "Best Single Issue".

- Concrete Celebrates Earth Day 1990 (52 pages, Dark Horse Comics, April 1990)

Dark Horse Presents (1992–1993)

- Issue 63 (32 pages, Dark Horse Comics, June 1992)
  - "Marie Dakar"; eight-page text-less short story and cover artist.
- Issues 70-76 (32 pages, Dark Horse Comics, February - August 1993)
  - "Madwoman of the Sacred Heart" (Volume 1); black & white, art and cover artist issues 70 and 73

City of Fire art portfolio (1993)
The fourth Mœbius outing of Dark Horse concerned a reissue of the art portfolio La Cité Feu – a collaborative art project of Giraud with Geoff Darrow – Starwatcher Graphics had released as an English language (for the introduction folio) "Limited American lux edition" version of 100 signed and numbered copies in January 1985 under its original title, alongside the French 950 copy original by Aedena. Some of the art is reproduced in the aforementioned Fusion art book by Epic.

- City of Fire (10 folios, Dark Horse, 1993); Unsigned and limited, though print run is unknown, 14.5"x19" sized lithograph prints with cover folio in envelope, as opposed to the hardboard box of the 1985 release. Also lacking the by Mœbius written introduction folio for that release, original cover, description and two black and white art folios, which are however replaced by two color additions.

Mœbius collection (1996)
Having added the 0-volume to the Collected Fantasies series in 1990, Dark Horse Comics too decided to release a Mœbius specific – meaning without his Western work – collection themselves, this time executed in the standard US comic book-sized format and soliciting the editorial input from Jean-Marc Lofficier who had already done so for the previous efforts. Though much of the contents was essentially a recapitulation of the Marvel/Epic publications, Lofficier made use of the opportunity to add work Mœbius had created after the Marvel/Epic publications had run its course, such as the story The Man from the Ciguri (a sequel to The Airtight Garage) and the first two outings of the Madwomen of the sacred Heart series.

- Arzach (80 pages, Dark Horse Comics, February 1996, ISBN 1569711321)
- Exotics (80 pages, Dark Horse Comics, April 1996, ISBN 1569711348)
- The Man from the Ciguri (80 pages, Dark Horse Comics, May 1996, ISBN 1569711356), collecting the episodes as originally serialized in black & white in the publisher's Cheval Noir (French for Dark Horse) magazine (issues 26–30, 33–37, 40–41, and 50, 1992–1994).
- H.P.'s Rock City (80 pages, Dark Horse Comics, June 1996, ISBN 156971133X)
- Madwomen of the sacred Heart (144 pages, Dark Horse Comics, August 1996, ISBN 1569711364); black & white, collecting the first volume as serialized in their 1993 Dark Horse Presents magazine, augmented with volume 2.

Mœbius Library (2016–)
Twenty years later, in April 2016, Dark Horse announced an ambitious project called the "Mœbius Library" to be released by its book division in American graphic novel hardcover format – even though the later added Doctor Moebius and Mister Gir title became executed as a softcover release. The stated intent was to predominantly publish latter day work by Mœbius in conjunction with, and originally published under the auspices of, his own publishing house "Mœbius Production", headed after his death in 2012 by second wife Isabelle. The first title was released in October 2016, which promptly won an Eisner Award. Tenured Dark Horse editor and Mœbius aficionado Diana Schutz served as the Mœbius Library project manager as well as the regular translator for the entirety of the collection, with the exception of the Doctor Moebius and Mister Gir special which was translated by freelancer Edward Gauvin due to the temporary unavailability of Schutz. Schutz also served as the liaison between Dark Horse and Mœbius Production/Isabelle Giraud. Dark Horse permanent staffer Adam Pruett has been the regular letterer for the entirety of the collection. The collection differs in this respect from its French source material that each of its releases is substantially expanded by Schutz with extensive annotations and glossaries to familiarize American readers with BD terminology which European readership takes for granted as well as to give American readership some perspective on Mœbius' career and intentions for the work in question.

- Mœbius Library 1 - The World of Edena (360 pages, Dark Horse Books, October 2016, ISBN 9781506702162); featuring the first time English language version of the last installment Sra, thereby completing The World of Edena series in English. Recipient of a 2017 Eisner Award in the category "Best U.S. Edition of International Material".
- Mœbius Library 2 - Inside Moebius, Part 1 (216 pages, Dark Horse Books, February 2018, ISBN 9781506703206); collects the first two volumes of the French source publication
- Mœbius Library 3 - The Art of Edena (208 pages, Dark Horse Books, April 2018, ISBN 9781506703213); art/comic book hybrid, collects the Edena short stories as well as Edena associated art.
- Mœbius Library 4 - Inside Moebius, Part 2 (264 pages, Dark Horse Books, June 2018, ISBN 9781506704968); collects the middle two volumes of the French source publication
- Mœbius Library 5 - Inside Moebius, Part 3 (280 pages, Dark Horse Books, October 2018, ISBN 9781506706047); collects the last two volumes of the French source publication
- Mœbius Library 6 - The Major (184 pages, Dark Horse Books, July 2024, ISBN 9781506719511); edited translation of the 2011 French source publication
- Mœbius Library 7 - The Depressed Hunter (88 pages, Dark Horse Books, June 2026, ISBN 9781506753249); edited translation of the 2008 French source publication
- Mœbius Library Special 1 - Doctor Moebius and Mister Gir (288 pages, Dark Horse Books, December 2023, ISBN 9781506713434); faithful translation of the 2015 French 3rd edition source publication, but with minute editorial differences such as the omission of some accompanying art and the addition of the postscript editorial glossary. The renowned on interviews based Mœbius biography by Numa Sadoul had until late-2023 only seen two other-language editions, a 1992 German 2nd edition (ISBN 3551019002), and a 2017 Japanese 3rd edition release (ISBN 9784796876605).

Halo Graphic Novel (2021)

- Halo Graphic Novel (128 pages, Dark Horse Books, October 2021, ISBN 9781506725871); softcover trade paperback, US graphic novel format; reprint of the 2010 Marvel edition.

==== Kitchen Sink Press ====
Kitchen Sink Press was a publisher of underground comics, explaining the French Ticklers series, and had connotations with HM Communications, adopting some of its artist after the latter had become defunct. Concurrently they had merged with Tundra Publishing in 1993, explaining the Visions of Arzach anthology art book.

French Ticklers (1989–1990)
A short-lived comic book series, collecting work from French underground comic artists, including Giraud. Giraud's contributions concerned some of his early "Mœbius" work he had produced for Hara-Kiri in 1963–1964. Graphitti Designs subsequently collected all early Mœbius work in their 1992 Collected Fantasies contribution as "Mœbius ½". All three black & white issues featured a (color) cover by Mœbius.

- Issue 1 (32 pages, Kitchen Sink Press, October 1989)
- Issue 2 (32 pages, Kitchen Sink Press, December 1989)
- Issue 3 (32 pages, Kitchen Sink Press, February 1990)

Legends of Arzach (1992)
This original American publication consists of six, 9.2"x12.2" sized, art portfolios, each of them containing an introduction plate, a by Giraud illustrated booklet featuring a short story by R.J.M. Lofficier, set in the Arzach universe, and eight art prints by American comic artists, paying homage to Mœbius' seminal character, 48 in total. Lofficier later expanded upon his short stories in his 2000 book title by iBOOKS, mentioned below.

- Gallery 1 - Charcoal burner of Ravenwood (Tundra Publishing, January 1992, ISBN 1879450216)
- Gallery 2 - White Pteron (Tundra Publishing, March 1992, ISBN 1879450240)
- Gallery 3 - Keep of two moons (Tundra Publishing, May 1992, ISBN 1879450259)
- Gallery 4 - The Rock of Everlasting Despair (Tundra Publishing, July 1992, ISBN 1879450267)
- Gallery 5 - The Keeper of the Earth's Treasures (Tundra Publishing, September 1992, ISBN 1879450275)
- Gallery 6 - The Fountains of Summer (Tundra Publishing, November 1992, ISBN 1879450283)

"Visions of Arzach" (1993)
Original American art book publication with a new cover by Mœbius, collecting the art prints by American artists from Legends of Arzach with a few additions.

- Visions of Arzach (56 pages, Kitchen Sink Press, December 1993, ISBN 087816233X); European graphic novel format sized hardcover trade edition.

==== iBOOKS ====
IBOOKS Inc. was a publishing imprint of Byron Preiss, who had previously been the editor-in-chief and co-publisher of the 1989 The Art of Mœbius book by Epic. Preiss incidentally, was also the editor-in-chief for the hereafter mentioned by Mœbius illustrated 1987 Project Pendulum science fiction novel.

"Mœbius Arzach" (2000)

- Mœbius Arzach (291 pages, iBOOKS, August 2000, ISBN 0743400151); Illustrated trade paperback softcover novel, taking place in the Arzach universe.

Icaro (2003–2004)

- Book 1 (160 pages, iBOOKS, November 2003, ISBN 0743475380); Softcover trade paperback
- Book 2 (140 pages, iBOOKS, January 2004, ISBN 0743479807); Softcover trade paperback

==== Humanoids Publishing ====
After the initial cooperation with DC Comics in the mid-2000s, publisher Humanoids, Inc. (until 2013 the US subsidiary of the French publisher co-founded by Moebius in 1974) has from 2010 onward begun to reissue new editions of Mœbius works on its own, starting with two of Mœbius's past collaborations with Alejandro Jodorowsky: The Incal and Madwoman of the Sacred Heart. Humanoids releases these latter-day hardcover editions, usually without dust jacket, in variant size formats, US graphic novel format (trade editions), oversized format (which is essentially the larger, standard European graphic novel A4 format), and the even larger coffee table format, the latter typically in a limited print run. Aside from the English language publications, Humanoids occasionally imports French deluxe, limited edition specialty Moebius editions, such as Le Garage hermétique (ISBN 9782731652253) and Arzach (ISBN 9782731634365), from the parent publisher especially on behalf of its American readership. The post-2010 Humanoids editions are also intended for, and disseminated to, the British-Canadian and UK markets, with the exception of two 2011 Incal editions, which were licensed and featured variant cover art.

The Metabarons (2002)
Giraud had created one 8-page short story "Au coeur de l'inviolable meta bunker" in 1989, focusing on one of the major secondary characters from the Incal saga, The Metabaron, whose ancestry later received its own The Metabarons spin-off series. Though that story was redrawn by the series' artist Juan Giménez for later book publications, Giraud's original was published in black & white in the below-mentioned 1990 British publication, and subsequently included in an outing of Humanoids' "Prestige Format Comic Book" collection as "Metabaron 1: The Lost Pages", which introduced Valérie Beltran's new coloring for Giraud's Incal series.

- The Metabarons: "Alpha/Omega" (48 pages, Humanoids Inc, October 2002, ISBN 1930652410); Softcover trade edition

The Incal (2005–2022)
Excepting the early 2005 co-productions with DC Comics, all subsequent editions feature the original coloring. The two co-editions with DC featured an entirely new coloring by Valérie Beltran as well as some censorship in regard to nudity, neither of which sitting well with writer Jodorowsky, who interpreted the changes as a cheap ploy to entice a younger readership. Customer reviews for both titles on Amazon.com, showed that fans were largely in concordance with Jodorowsky's assessment. Considered a commercial failure, Beltran's coloring has never been used again after the initial (international) releases, be it in the United States or elsewhere in the world.

- The Incal (2005)
  - Volume 1:The Epic Conspiracy (160 pages, Humanoids/DC Comics, January 2005, ISBN 1401206298); Softcover trade edition, collecting volumes 1–3 from the French original source publications, including "Metabaron 1: The Lost Pages" as "Solune's Origin".
  - Volume 2:The Epic Journey (160 pages, Humanoids/DC Comics, June 2005, ISBN 1401206468); Softcover trade edition, collecting volumes 4–6 from the French original source publications.

Mœbius The Incal cover art for Humanoids' 2014 US hardcover trade anthology collection.

- The Incal anthology collections (2010–2022)
  - The Incal Classic Collection (308 pages, Humanoids Inc, December 2010, ISBN 9781594650116); To 750 copies limited oversized hardcover edition in hardboard slipcase.
  - The Incal Classic Collection (308 pages, Humanoids Inc, June 2011, ISBN 9781594650154); Hardcover trade edition, reprinted in May 2012, and April 2013.
  - The Incal (316 pages, Humanoids Inc, September 2014, ISBN 9781594650932); Hardcover trade edition, essentially a reprint, but featuring new introductions.
  - The Incal (324 pages, Humanoids Inc, February 2019, ISBN 9781594653445); To 1550 copies limited oversized two-volume hardcover collector's edition in deluxe hardboard slipcase.
  - The Incal (320 pages, Humanoids Inc, August 2020), ISBN 9781643379791); "Exclusive Direct Market Edition" softcover trade edition with deviant cover.
  - The Incal (320 pages, Humanoids Inc, September 2020), ISBN 9781643377803); Softcover trade edition.
  - The Incal (320 pages, Humanoids Inc, January 2022), ISBN 9781643378169); Oversized deluxe hardcover black & white edition.
- The Incal anthology collections (2011 licensed UK editions)
  - The Incal Classic Collection (308 pages, Titan Books, May 2011, ISBN 9780857685865); Hardcover trade edition.
  - The Incal (308 pages, SelfMadeHero, October 2011, ISBN 9781906838393); Hardcover trade edition.
- The Incal individual volumes (2013–2017); The six, 2013–2014, single title volumes, are each executed as a, to 999 copies limited, hardcover coffee table edition.
  - Volume 1: The Black Incal (48 pages, Humanoids Inc, January 2013, ISBN 9781594650291)
  - Volume 2: The Luminous Incal (48 pages, Humanoids Inc, March 2013, ISBN 9781594650277)
  - Volume 3: What Lies Beneath (56 pages, Humanoids Inc, May 2013, ISBN 9781594650093)
  - Volume 4: What Is Above (60 pages, Humanoids Inc, August 2013, ISBN 9781594650499)
  - Volume 5: The Fifth Essence Part One: The Dreaming Galaxy (48 pages, Humanoids Inc, November 2013, ISBN 9781594650543)
  - Volume 6: The Fifth Essence Part Two: Planet Difool (48 pages, Humanoids Inc, January 2014, ISBN 9781594650697)
  - Volume 1: The Incal - FCBD 2017 (32 pages, Humanoids Inc, May 2017, UPC 709445833524); truncated standard US comic book version of volume 1 as Humanoids' first "Free Comic Book Day" offering.

Madwoman of the Sacred Heart (2010–2022)
With the translation of volume 3 of the series, "The Sorbonne's Madman", these anthology collections complete the series.

- Madwoman of the Sacred Heart (192 pages, Humanoids Inc, December 2010, ISBN 9781594650987); Hardcover trade edition in dust jacket.
- Madwoman of the Sacred Heart (192 pages, Humanoids Inc, February 2012, ISBN 9781594650628); Softcover trade edition.
- Madwoman of the Sacred Heart (192 pages, Humanoids Inc, September 2013, ISBN 9781594650468); Hardcover trade edition with deviant cover.
- Madwoman of the Sacred Heart (192 pages, Humanoids Inc, September 2022, ISBN 9781643376523); Oversized hardcover edition, but essentially a reprint of the 2013 edition.
- The Jodorowsky Library, Volume 6 (304 pages, Humanoids Inc, June 2023, ISBN 9781643379548); Hardcover trade edition.

"The Eyes of the Cat" (2011–2013)

- The Eyes of the Cat (56 pages, Humanoids Inc, December 2011, ISBN 9781594650581); To 750 copies limited hardcover coffee table format edition with black & white art featured on white paper.
- The Eyes of the Cat (56 pages, Humanoids Inc, August 2012, ISBN 9781594650321); Hardcover trade edition with black & white art featured on white paper.
- The Eyes of the Cat (56 pages, Humanoids Inc, June 2013, ISBN 9781594650420); "Yellow edition" with deviant cover, hardcover trade edition with black & white art featured on yellow paper as originally published in French (and as published in Taboo 4).

"Angel Claws" (2013–2019)
Essentially a reissue of the 1997 Eurotica title, but on this occasion issued without a dust jacket, using the plural for the title, and featuring a deviant cover.

- Angel Claws (72 pages, Humanoids Inc, March 2013, ISBN 9781594650123); To 800 copies limited black & white hardcover coffee table format edition.
- Angel Claws (72 pages, Humanoids Inc, March 2019, ISBN 9781594653230); Hardcover trade edition.

Final Incal (2014–2022)
Though this three-volume series (originally called Après l'Incal – After the Incal) was ultimately realized with art from José Ladrönn, Giraud had actually already penciled the first outing in the series, "Le nouveau rêve", but which was replaced by a re-scripted and by Ladronn redrawn variant for reprint runs. The anthology editions below however, feature the Moebius 56-page original as well as a bonus. Actually, the series was from the start intended to be a purely Jodorowsky/Moebius follow-up to their acclaimed main series, but as stated on the artist's main page, it was Giraud who declined to continue afterwards.

- Final Incal (216 pages, Humanoids Inc, May 2014, ISBN 9781594650871); To 200 copies limited coffee table format edition in hardboard slipcase, issued with three art prints and a by Jodorowsky and Ladrönn signed and numbered bookplate.
- Final Incal (216 pages, Humanoids Inc, May 2014, ISBN 9781594650864); To 1500 copies limited oversized format edition in hardboard slipcase.
- The Jodorowsky Library, Volume 3 (416 pages, Humanoids Inc, August 2022, ISBN 9781643379067); Hardcover trade edition.

"Deconstructing The Incal" (2017)
An illustrated reference book dealing with the Incal universe. Faithful reproduction of the 2016 second, updated and expanded edition of the 1989 French "Les Mystères de l'Incal" original, but without the "Au coeur de l'inviolable meta bunker" short story in its original coloring, which was however published by the publisher in July 2020 as a digital release (ISBN 9781643379739) under its English title "In the Heart of the Impregnable Metabunker" (aka "Solune's Origin" as the story was coined by the publisher in its 2005 co-publication with DC).

- "Deconstructing The Incal" (112 pages, Humanoids Inc, October 2017, ISBN 9781594656903); Oversized hardcover trade edition.

==== Various ====
"Buffalo Bill, Scout and Frontiersman" (1968)
Earliest known English book publication with art by Giraud, faithful reproduction of the French original.

- "Buffalo Bill, Scout and Frontiersman" (68 pages, Feltham:Odhams Books, Ltd, 1968, OCLC 124715); illustrated hardcover textbook in European graphic novel format.

"Project Pendulum" (1987) An illustrated hardback science fiction novel with dust jacket written by Robert Silverberg and therefore a USA original. The by Mœbius illustrated book has as such seen reciprocally a translation in native French as a mass paperback release in J'ai lu's SF pocketbook collection (#3059, ISBN 2277230596) in 1991, with a reprint in 1994.

- "Project Pendulum" (200 pages, New York City:Walker & Company, September 1987, ISBN 0802767125)

The Magic Crystal (1989–1990)
Executed as softcovers in the European graphic novel format.

- #1 - The Magic Crystal (48 pages, New York City:Catalan Communications, September 1989, ISBN 0874160677)
- #2 - Island of the Unicorn (48 pages, Catalan Communications, February 1990, ISBN 0874160847)
- #3 - Aurelys's Secret (48 pages, Catalan Communications, May 1990, ISBN 0874161029)

"Eyes of the Cat" (1990)
For unknown reasons, this 54-page work had been left out of the Marvel/Epic collection of the 1980s–1990s, despite the fact that the work was hailed by comic critics as a graphic masterpiece. Still, the story did see a contemporary first-time English-language publication, with elaborate annotations from its authors, in this graphic novel anthology. The black & white Mœbius story was as only one printed on yellow paper, like it was in the original French source publication. The anthology featured the rejected Les Chiens 1979 movie poster by Mœbius as cover. In the 2010s reissued several times by Humanoides Publishing as specified above.

- Taboo 4 (168 pages, Wilmington, VT:Spiderbaby Grafix & Publications, January 1990, ISBN 0922003033); black & white softcover trade paperback

The Mœbius Portfolio (1990)
By Lofficier coined section name (1 illustrated page) for the three Moebius contributions to this British graphic novel anthology, which consisted of "In the heart of the impregnable meta-bunker" (8 pages, first time English language publication), "Carnet 3: The Mœbius Sketchbook" (8 pages), and "Mœbius Circa '74" (8 pages). Giraud provided the promotional poster art for this outing, but not the cover.

- A1: Book Four (96 pages, London: Atomeka Press, April 1990, ISBN 187187856X); black & white softcover trade paperback

Mœbius Collector Cards (1993)

- Mœbius Collector Cards trading card set (Saddle Brook, NJ: Comic Images, 1993, OCLC 931830987); basic set of 90 cards plus 6 chase "Chromium Cards", original US release without any other (-language) editions.

"Mœbius: a retrospective" (1995)
A to 2500 copies limited exposition catalog for the similarly named exhibition at the Cartoon Art Museum, listed above.

- "Mœbius: a retrospective" (40 pages, San Francisco: Cartoon Art Museum, April 1995, OCLC 472884855); standard American softcover comic book format

Mœbius Ashcan Comics (1995–1999)
A publication by Giraud's own American publisher, and therefore not only an American original, but also a typical company release, to wit a limited, collector's edition intended for sale at comic conventions only. The mini-series collected hitherto unpublished art and shorts, and were edited by the company's co-shareholder J.M. Lofficier after the artist's return to native France.

- #1 - Moebius ashcan comics 1 (16 pages, Los Angeles:Starwatcher Graphics, 1995); black & white standard American comic book format, limited to 250 numbered copies + 25 "artist proofs" (AP) with embossed publisher seal
- #2 - Moebius ashcan comics presents: Ratman (16 pages, Los Angeles:Starwatcher Graphics, 1995); black & white standard American comic book format, limited to 250 numbered copies + 25 "artist proofs" (AP) with embossed publisher seal
- #3 - Moebius ashcan comics presents: Dune (16 pages, Starwatcher Graphics, 1995); black & white standard American comic book format, limited to 100 numbered copies + 25 "artist proofs" (AP) with embossed publisher seal; featuring storyboards and conceptart for Jodorowsky's abandoned Dune movie project
- #4 - Moebius ashcan comics 4 (16 pages, Starwatcher Graphics, 1997); black & white standard American comic book format, limited to 100 numbered copies + 25 "artist proofs" (AP) with embossed publisher seal
- #5 - Moebius ashcan comics presents: Coffee Dreams (16 pages, Starwatcher Graphics, 1997); black & white standard American comic book format, limited to 100 numbered copies + 25 "artist proofs" (AP) with embossed publisher seal
- #6 - Moebius ashcan comics presents: Crystal Dream (16 pages, Starwatcher Graphics, 1998); black & white standard American comic book format, limited to 100 numbered copies + 25 "artist proofs" (AP) with embossed publisher seal
- #7 - Moebius ashcan comics presents: Metreon (16 pages, Starwatcher Graphics, 1999); "special color issue" standard American comic book format in wraparound cover, limited to 100 numbered copies + 25 "artist proofs" (AP) with embossed publisher seal

Mœbius Comics (1996–1997)
Interior art executed in black & white, the series features a reprint of The Man from the Ciguri, but also new, and previously unseen Mœbius comics and art. Noteworthy are his storyboards for the abandoned Internal Transfer movie. Also featured in the series is a black & white version of the short story "The Still Planet", previously published in Concrete Celebrates Earth Day 1990, but this version sporting a different last page. J.M. Lofficier reprised his role as series editor for these comic book outings.

- Issue 1 (32 pages, Wayne County, MI:Caliber Comics, May 1996)
- Issue 2 (32 pages, Caliber Comics, July 1996)
- Issue 3 (32 pages, Caliber Comics, September 1996)
- Issue 4 (32 pages, Caliber Comics, November 1996)
- Issue 5 (32 pages, Caliber Comics, January 1997)
- Issue 6 (32 pages, Caliber Comics, March 1997); in wraparound cover.

"Angel Claw" (1997)
Due to the graphic, erotic nature of the book, this work of Mœbius has not been published in the US in the 1990s by the "usual suspects", but rather by outlier NBM Publishing under its "Eurotica" imprint, as a European A4 format padded hardcover in dust jacket book. In the 2010s reissued several times by Humanoides Publishing as specified above.

- "Angel Claw" (72 pages, New York City:Eurotica, February 1997, ISBN 1561631531); black & white.

"The Illustrated Alchemist" (1998)

- "The Illustrated Alchemist: A Fable About Following Your Dream" (224 pages, New York City:HarperCollins, November 1998, ISBN 006019250X); English language hardback in dust jacket version of the by Mœbius illustrated 1994 French "L'Alchimiste" edition. The American edition made use of the revised 1995 French edition (ISBN 2910188701) for which Mœbius created 14 additional illustrations, increasing the total count from 21 to 35 illustrations.

"The story of an idea" (2007)
A ten-page promotional brochure, featuring an eight-page comic by Giraud as Mœbius, detailing the history and aims of the International Red Cross and Red Crescent Movement. Especially created for the organization, the full color, standard European comic album sized, brochure was widely disseminated by the organization in French, English, Mandarin, Arabic and Spanish. The English language edition enjoyed a first print run of 48,000 copies, augmented with a 40,000 copy reprint run in May 2009.

- "The story of an idea" (10 pages, Geneva:International Federation of Red Cross and Red Crescent Societies, December 2007)

XIII (2013)

- XIII - #18: "The Irish Version" (48 pages, Canterbury:Cinebook, April 2013, ISBN 9781849181457)
