= The Summit of the Gods (film) =

2021 animated film

- Theatrical release poster
- Directed by: Patrick Imbert
- Written by: Patrick Imbert; Magali Pouzol; Jean-Charles Ostorero
- Based on: The Summit of the Gods by Jiro Taniguchi
- Produced by: Jean-Charles Osotorero; Didier Brunner; Damien Brunner; Stéphan Roelants
- Music by: Amine Bouhafa
- Production companies: Folivari; Mélusine Productions
- Distributed by: Diaphana Distribution (France); Wild Bunch (international)
- Release dates: July 15, 2021 (Cannes Film Festival); September 22, 2021
- Running time: 90 minutes
- Countries: France; Luxembourg
- Language: French

The Summit of the Gods (French: Le Sommet des Dieux) is a 2021 French-language animated adventure drama film based on the Japanese manga series of the same name by Jiro Taniguchi. The film was directed by Patrick Imbert; it was first shown at the 2021 Cannes Film Festival in July 2021 before a full theatrical release in September 2021.

== Plot ==
In 1924, British mountaineers George Mallory and Andrew Irvine attempted to climb Mount Everest and were never seen again. Seventy years later, Makoto Fukamachi, a young Japanese reporter, encounters a mysterious mountain climber named Habu Joji, in whose hands Fukamachi thinks he sees Mallory's camera, which might reveal if Mallory and his companion really were the first to climb Everest.

Fukamachi tries to find more information on Habu, researching Habu's past climbs and interviewing former acquaintances. He learns of Habu's tendency to climb solo, which intensified after the accidental death of a young mentee who insisted on climbing with Habu. Fukamachi becomes more obsessed with finding Habu and begins fitness training in preparation for mountaineering. His fixation culminates in a trip to Nepal in search of Habu. Fukumachi eventually finds him at a hut near Mount Everest where Habu initially pushes him away. Habu eventually gives in to the photographer's request to document Habu's record attempt—a solo climb of Everest's southeastern face in the harsh winter season. Fukamachi agrees to the solo climb rules which prohibit him from speaking to or assisting Habu during the climb, and vice versa.

The pair set out for the climb, with Fukamachi following Habu. However, a storm causes Fukamachi to fall behind, overwhelmed by pain and exhaustion. Habu doubles back to save him, consequently forfeiting his solo climb attempt. Fukamachi recovers and returns to the base without Habu, who carries on with his journey. Habu reaches the summit. After days of waiting with no sign of Habu, Fukamachi returns to Japan from the base carrying Mallory's camera and a letter, both passed along from Habu via his sherpa. Habu writes that if Fukamachi is reading the letter, Habu died after continuing his attempt to reach the summit, and he did so with no regrets.

In the end, Fukamachi develops the camera film. Having learned why Habu and other mountaineers keep going back to mountaineering despite the dangers, he eventually returns to summit Everest, just like Habu.

== Production ==
The film is based on a manga series of the same name, written and illustrated by Jiro Taniguchi, which was based on a 1998 novel by Baku Yumemakura. In January 2015, a French-language CG animation film adaptation of the manga was announced. It was originally set to be produced by Julianne Films, Walking The Dog, and Mélusine Productions, with direction from Éric Valli and Jean-Christophe Roger. In June 2020, it was announced the film would instead be directed by Patrick Imbert, with scripts by Imbert, Magali Pouzol, and Jean-Charles Ostorero, and music composed by Amine Bouhafa. It was also announced the film would be distributed by Diaphana Distribution in France and Wild Bunch internationally. The film was first shown at the 2021 Cannes Film Festival on July 15, 2021, before a full theatrical release in France starting on September 22, 2021.

Internationally, Netflix released the film in theaters in the United States starting on November 24, 2021, and in the United Kingdom on November 26, 2021. The film was made available for streaming on November 30, 2021.

== Reception ==
Carlos Aguilar from TheWrap praised the film for its plot and animation. Michael Nordine from Variety also praised the plot and animation, specifically for being realistic. Benjamin Benoit from IGN also gave the film praise for being a great adaptation of the original source material. On the review aggregator website Rotten Tomatoes, the film holds an approval rating of 100% based on 36 reviews, with an average rating of 7.8/10.

=== Accolades ===
Year	Award	Category	Recipient	Result
2022	Lumière Awards	Best Animated Film	The Summit of the Gods	Won
2022	César Awards	Best Animated Film	The Summit of the Gods	Won
2022	Annie Awards	Best Animated Feature – Independent	The Summit of the Gods	Nominated
