= Furari =

Japanese manga series

- Cover of the volume

ふらり。
- Genre: Historical
- Manga
- Written by: Jiro Taniguchi
- Published by: Kodansha
- English publisher: NA: Fanfare/Ponent Mon
- Magazine: Morning
- Original run: January 13, 2011 – April 21, 2011
- Volumes: 1

Furari (Japanese: ふらり。) is a Japanese manga series written and illustrated by Jiro Taniguchi. It was serialized in Kodansha's magazine Morning from January to April 2011 and published in one volume. It follows cartographer Inō Tadataka as he surveys Edo-period Japan.

== Publication ==
Written and illustrated by Jiro Taniguchi, the series began serialization in Kodansha's magazine Morning on January 13, 2011. It completed serialization in Morning on April 21, 2011. Its individual chapters were collected into one tankōbon volume, which was released on April 22, 2011.

In September 2013, Fanfare/Ponent Mon began listing that they would publish the series in English. They released the volume on August 31, 2017.

== Reception ==
Zack Davisson of World Literature Today felt the story was similar to The Walking Man's, while specifically praising the characters. He also praised the illustrations, which he compared to those by Katsuhiro Otomo and Terry Moore. A columnist for Manga News praised the setting and illustrations, particularly those of nature.

The series was nominated for the Eisner Award for Best U.S. Edition of International Material—Asia in 2018.
