= A Zoo in Winter =

Japanese manga

- Japanese cover

冬の動物園 (Fuyu no Dōbutsuen)
- Genre: Slice of life, Romance
- Manga
- Written by: Jiro Taniguchi
- Published by: Shogakukan
- English publisher: ^{NA/UK} Fanfare/Ponent Mon
- Magazine: Big Comic Original
- Original run: 2005 – 2007
- Volumes: 1

A Zoo in Winter (冬の動物園, Fuyu no Dōbutsuen) is a Japanese one-shot manga written and illustrated by Jiro Taniguchi. It was serialized in the Shogakukan seinen manga magazine Big Comic Original between 2005 and 2007. The manga's seven chapters were compiled into a single tankōbon and released on 28 March 2008. A Zoo in Winter was translated into English and released by Fanfare/Ponent Mon on 23 June 2011. It was nominated for the Outstanding Graphic Novel category in the 16th Ignatz Awards in 2012.

== Plot ==
Hamaguchi is an 18-year-old whose dream of becoming a graphic artist can not find fulfilment in his every-day job as an office drone for a clothing wholesaler. He moves to Tokyo and, thanks to a friend, gets a job as a famous manga artist's assistant. Though the job is demanding and the hours are grueling (especially as deadlines near), he feels he has found his calling.

He starts to work on his own manga with the little free time he has, but lacks the self-confidence to get very far. One day he is introduced to a pretty young girl of fragile health whom he is asked to walk around on those days she can get out of the hospital. With her encouragements and her input, he finds the focus to complete his manga and submit it to a publishing company. However, her deteriorating condition prevents him from acting out on his growing love for her.
