= Icaro (manga) =

Japanese manga series

- Tankōbon volume cover (Bijutsu Shuppansha edition)

異卡力(イカル) (Ikaru)
- Genre: Science fiction
- Manga
- Written by: Moebius
- Illustrated by: Jiro Taniguchi
- Published by: Kodansha; Bijutsu Shuppansha
- English publisher: Simon & Schuster
- Magazine: Morning
- Original run: July 1997 – September 1997
- Volumes: 1
- icon

Icaro (Japanese: 異卡力(イカル), Hepburn: Ikaru; lit. 'Strange Power') is a Japanese manga series written by Moebius and illustrated by Jiro Taniguchi. It was serialized in Kodansha's seinen manga magazine Morning from July to September 1997.

== Synopsis ==
Since his birth, a boy named Icaro has had the ability to fly. He was taken away from his mother and grew up in the care of the government, which tried to research his abilities. Icaro falls in love with one of the researchers and discovers his own free will. He tries to escape his prison before they are able to take away his urge for freedom from him.

== Development and release ==
At the time of Icaro's serialization, then editor-in-chief of Kodansha's seinen manga magazine Morning, Yoshiyuki Kurihara, was interested in doing international cultural exchange through manga; between 1989 and 1998, the editorial department for Morning ran an international project inviting artists and writers from overseas to create manga in the magazine. While introducing works by Japanese artists like Jiro Taniguchi to France, Kurihara also helmed a project to have a Japanese artist illustrate a story by French artist and writer Moebius. Moebius expressed a desire to work with Taniguchi, having read his previous work The Walking Man, and Taniguchi agreed to be the artist.

The ensuing work, Icaro, was serialized in Morning in 1997, from the magazine's 31st issue to its 43rd issue that year (cover dated July 17 and October 9, 1997, respectively). It was illustrated by Taniguchi with scripts by Moebius that would have filled around ten volumes. Taniguchi made some changes to the scripts, later explaining that "what was difficult was that the European point of view is not easily understood by the Japanese. So the issue was how to modify it so that it was easy for Japanese readers to understand. And, since it was a scenario, some parts were explained in a long way that needed to be shortened. I remember it was pretty hard to work on that." He did not work directly with Moebius, instead working through an editorial intermediary.

The manga was unpopular with readers at the time. Kurihara was succeeded in his chief editorial role by Tamotsu Kutomi, whose new magazine policies forced Icaro to be canceled after only one volume's worth of content was made. Its chapters were collected and published in one volume by Bijutsu Shuppansha on November 30, 2000, three years after its initial serialization. A translation into French, as well as Italian and Polish, was published by Kana. An English version was published by Simon & Schuster. The German translation of the manga was published in 2016 by Schreiber & Leser in a single volume.

== Reception ==
Peter Osteried described the work as a great collaboration between the two well-known artists. Besides the European influences in Taniguchi's style, influences from Katsuhiro Otomo's Akira can be seen, who in turn was influenced by Moebius. All in all, the work is a "perfect synthesis of French-Belgian and Japanese comics". Lars von Törne underlines in the Tagesspiegel that the work shows how important western comics were for Taniguchi's style.
