= Search and Destroy (manga) =

Japanese manga series by Atsushi Kaneko

- First tankōbon volume cover

サーチアンドデストロイ (Sāchi Ando Desutoroi)
- Genre: Science fiction
- Created by: Osamu Tezuka
- Manga
- Written by: Atsushi Kaneko
- Published by: Micro Magazine
- English publisher: NA: Fantagraphics
- Imprint: TC Comics
- Magazine: TezuComi
- Original run: October 5, 2018 – March 5, 2020
- Volumes: 3
- icon

Search and Destroy (Japanese: サーチアンドデストロイ, Hepburn: Sāchi Ando Desutoroi) is a Japanese manga series written and illustrated by Atsushi Kaneko. The series is a science fiction retelling based on the Dororo manga series written and illustrated by Osamu Tezuka, and was serialized in Micro Magazine's Tezuka tribute manga magazine TezuComi from October 2018 to March 2020.

== Synopsis ==
The series is set in a near-future Japan, where robots named "creatures" serve Japan's upper class and attack the underprivileged. Doro, a girl who is on the run from the yakuza, meets a mysterious girl with mechanical arms named Hyaku who attacks one of the "creatures".

== Publication ==
Written and illustrated by Atsushi Kaneko, Search and Destroy is based on the Dororo manga series written and illustrated by Osamu Tezuka. It was serialized in Micro Magazine's Tezuka tribute manga magazine TezuComi from October 5, 2018, to March 5, 2020. Its chapters were compiled into three tankōbon volumes released from April 5, 2019, to March 27, 2020.

In July 2023, the series was licensed for English publication by the manga-focused podcast Mangasplaining for their "Mangasplaining Extra" newsletter, with a print release by Fantagraphics initially set for February 2024. The volumes were released from July 23, 2024, to November 25, 2025.

No.	Original release date	Original ISBN	North American release date	North American ISBN
1	April 5, 2019	978-4-89637-869-6	July 23, 2024	978-1-68-396932-7
Chapters 1–6; Prologue and "Pretty Hate Machine"
2	October 5, 2019	978-4-89637-938-9	June 3, 2025	979-8-87500-052-2
Chapters 7–12
3	March 27, 2020	978-4-89637-997-6	November 25, 2025	978-1-68-396966-2
Chapters 13–18; Epilogue

== Reception ==
The first volume was nominated at the Japan Society and Anime NYC's first American Manga Awards for Best Lettering in 2024; the series was nominated for Best Continuing Manga Series, while its second volume was also nominated for Best Lettering and Best Translation at the second edition in 2025; and its third volume for Best Continuing Manga Series in 2026. Library Journal listed the first volume in its Best Graphic Novels of 2024. The first volume was nominated for the Eisner Award in the Best U.S. Edition of International Material—Asia category in 2025.
