= The Summit of the Gods =

Manga by Jiro Taniguchi

- Cover of the first volume of The Summit of the Gods, as released by Shueisha

神々の山嶺 (Kamigami no Itadaki)
- Genre: Historical
- Manga
- Written by: Jiro Taniguchi
- Published by: Shueisha
- English publisher: NA/UK: Fanfare/Ponent Mon
- Magazine: Business Jump
- Original run: 2000 – 2003
- Volumes: 5
- Live-action film

Everest: Kamigami no Itadaki
- Directed by: Hideyuki Hirayama
- Written by: Masato Kato
- Music by: Takashi Kako
- Studio: Kadokawa Corporation
- Released: March 12, 2016
- Animated film
- The Summit of the Gods

The Summit of the Gods (Japanese: 神々の山嶺, Hepburn: Kamigami no Itadaki) is a manga series written and illustrated by Jiro Taniguchi. Based on a 1998 novel by Baku Yumemakura, it follows Fukamachi, a photographer who finds a camera supposedly belonging to George Mallory, a mountaineer who went missing on Mount Everest, and goes on a mountain-climbing adventure along with his friend Habu Joji.

== Plot ==
In 1924, British climbers George Mallory and Andrew Irvine disappeared during their attempt to become the first people to reach the summit of Mount Everest, leaving unanswered the question of whether they succeeded before dying. In 1993 Kathmandu, Japanese photographer Makoto Fukamachi, accompanying an Everest expedition, discovers an old camera in a small antique shop that he believes may have belonged to Mallory. Before he can secure it, the camera is taken by a taciturn man known locally as "Bikha Sanp," whom Fukamachi suspects is actually Jōji Habu, a once-legendary Japanese solo climber who vanished from the mountaineering world years earlier.

Unable to confront Habu directly, Fukamachi begins tracing the climber's past, uncovering a life defined by obsession, isolation, and an uncompromising pursuit of the highest peaks. The narrative alternates between Fukamachi's investigation and Habu's climbing history, revealing his rise as an exceptional but self-destructive alpinist driven to test human limits. As Fukamachi's search leads him back toward Everest itself, linking Habu's fate to the enduring mystery of Mallory and Irvine.

== Release ==
The manga was originally serialized in the magazine Business Jump by Shueisha between May 2000 and July 2003 issues. It was collected into five tankōbon published between December 15, 2000, and March 20, 2003, then re-released in bunkoban between October 18, 2006, and January 18, 2007. An English-language version was licensed by British company Fanfare/Ponent Mon in 2007. On July 23, 2009, its first volume was released, and the last was released on July 31, 2015. It has also been published in French by Kana in 2004–2005, German by Schreiber & Leser, and Spanish by Ponent Mon.

== Reception ==
In 2001, it was awarded a prize for excellence by the Agency for Cultural Affairs at the Japan Media Arts Festival, which praised its "powerful illustrations [that] seem to transport the reader right up into the mountains." Its English adaptation received a nomination for Ignatz Award for Outstanding Graphic Novel and Outstanding Series in 2010. The fourth English volume also was nominated at the 2014 Eisner Award in the category "Best U.S. Edition of International Material—Asia".

== Adaptations ==
=== Live-action film ===
The manga was adapted into a live-action film, Everest: Kamigami no Itadaki (エヴェレスト 神々の山嶺, Everesuto Kamigami no Itadaki), directed by Hideyuki Hirayama and starring Junichi Okada, Hiroshi Abe and Machiko Ono. Distributed by Asmik Ace Entertainment and Toho, it was released on March 12, 2016, and grossed ¥1.26 billion.

=== Animated film ===
In January 2015, an international co-production was announced between French Julianne Films, Belgian Walking The Dog and Luxembourg Mélusine Productions to create an animated film based on The Summit of the Gods. Éric Valli and Jean-Christophe Roger were set direct the film, with Didier Brunner as producer. In June 2020, it was announced the film would instead be directed by Patrick Imbert, with scripts by Imbert, Magali Pouzol, and Jean-Charles Ostorero, and music composed by Amine Bouhafa. In August 2021, Netflix announced that it would be distributing the film to select movie theaters in the United States on November 24, 2021, followed by its streaming service debut on November 30.

== See also ==
- List of media related to Mount Everest
