= A Journal of My Father =

Japanese manga series

父の暦 (Chichi no Koyomi)
- Manga
- Written by: Jiro Taniguchi
- Published by: Shogakukan
- English publisher: NA: Fanfare/Ponent Mon
- Magazine: Big Comic
- Published: November 30, 1994
- Volumes: 1

A Journal of My Father (Japanese: 父の暦, Hepburn: Chichi no Koyomi) is a Japanese manga series written and illustrated by Jiro Taniguchi. It was serialized in Big Comic and published in one volume by Shogakukan in November 1994.

== Synopsis ==
His father, who lived in his hometown of Tottori, died. The people of his hometown welcome him warmly when he returns for the wake and talk about his father's memories. A father's kindness that "I" didn't know is told, and "I" regretted closing his heart to his father and not trying to understand his heart.

== Media ==
=== Manga ===
The series is written and illustrated by Jiro Taniguchi. The series was serialized in Big Comic and published by Shogakukan in a single tankōbon volume, which was released in Japan on November 30, 1994.

In 2020, Fanfare and Ponent Mon announced they licensed the series for English publication.

=== Other media ===
Tottori, Taniguchi's hometown, created a committee to adapt the manga into a film. The series was also used as a base by artists of a sand sculpture that was built by Taniguchi's hometown after his death.

== Reception ==
The series was awarded the Jury Award at the Angoulême International Comics Festival in 2001. In 2002, it won the Haxtur Award for Best Long Comic Strip. In 2015, the series won the award for the best translated comic at the Sproing Awards. Also in 2015, the series was awarded the National Comic Book Classics Award at Amadora BD. In 2021, the series was nominated for the Eisner Award for Best U.S. Edition of International Material—Asia.

Raimaru from Manga News praised the series, calling it "full of emotion". The columnists for BD Guest also praised it for the same reason as Raimaru. Rebecca Silverman from Anime News Network also praised the series, calling it "thoughtful and emotional", while calling the narrative "unbalanced [at times]".
