= Robo Sapiens =

Japanese manga series by Toranosuke Shimada

- Robo Sapiens: Tales of Tomorrow
- First volume cover

ロボ・サピエンス前史 (Robo Sapiensu Zenshi)
- Genre: Science fiction
- Manga
- Written by: Toranosuke Shimada
- Published by: Kodansha
- English publisher: NA: Seven Seas Entertainment
- Magazine: Monthly Morning Two
- Original run: July 21, 2018 – June 22, 2019
- Volumes: 2

Robo Sapiens: Tales of Tomorrow (Japanese: ロボ・サピエンス前史, Hepburn: Robo Sapiensu Zenshi) is a Japanese anthology manga series written and illustrated by Toranosuke Shimada. It was serialized in Kodansha's seinen manga magazine Monthly Morning Two from July 2018 to June 2019, with its chapters collected in two wideban volumes.

== Publication ==
Robo Sapiens: Tales of Tomorrow' is written and illustrated by Toranosuke Shimada. It was serialized in Kodansha's seinen manga magazine Monthly Morning Two from July 21, 2018, to June 22, 2019. Kodansha collected its chapters in two wideban volumes, both released on August 23, 2019.

In North America, Seven Seas Entertainment announced in May 2021 that they had licensed the series in English and published it in an omnibus edition on December 7, 2021. The manga is also licensed in France by Noeve Grafx.

=== Volumes ===
No.	Original release date	Original ISBN	English release date	English ISBN
1	August 23, 2019	978-4-06-516886-8	December 7, 2021	978-1-64827-598-2
2	August 23, 2019	978-4-06-516887-5	December 7, 2021	978-1-64827-598-2

== Reception ==
Robo Sapiens ranked second on Takarajimasha's Kono Manga ga Sugoi! list of best manga of 2020 for male readers. In December 2019, Brutus magazine listed Robo Sapiens on their "Most Dangerous Manga" list, which included works with the most "stimulating" and thought-provoking themes. It was nominated for the 24th Tezuka Osamu Cultural Prize in 2020. Robo Sapiens won the Manga Division's Grand Prize of the 23rd Japan Media Arts Festival Awards in 2020. The manga was nominated for the 51st Seiun Awards in the comic category in 2020. The School Library Journal listed the first volume of Robo Sapiens as one of the top 10 manga of 2021. The series was nominated for the Eisner Award for Best U.S. Edition of International Material—Asia in 2022.
