= Ishinomaki Senshu University =

Coordinates: 38°27′13.6″N 141°17′39.3″E

- 石巻専修大学
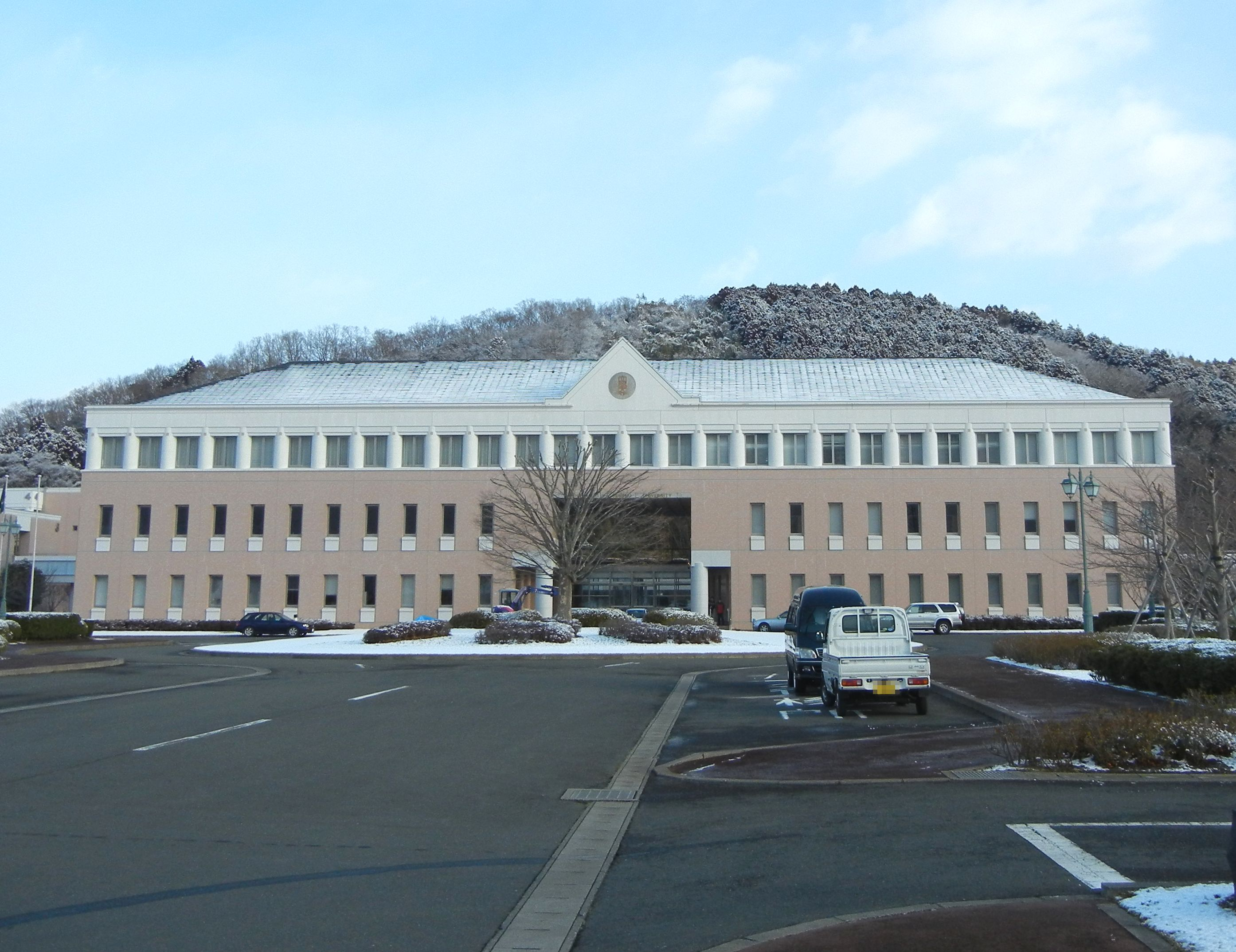
- Type: Private
- Established: 1989
- Affiliations: Senshu University
- Students: 1,658
- Location: Ishinomaki, Miyagi Prefecture, Japan

Ishinomaki Senshu University (石巻専修大学, Ishinomaki senshū daigaku), an affiliated university of Senshu University, is a private university in Ishinomaki, Miyagi, Japan, established in 1989. The predecessor Senshu University was founded in 1880.
