= The Quest for the Missing Girl =

Japanese manga series

- Cover for the English volume

捜索者 (Sōsakusha)
- Genre: Mystery
- Manga
- Written by: Jiro Taniguchi
- Published by: Shogakukan
- English publisher: NA: Fanfare/Ponet Mon
- Magazine: Big Comic
- Published: December 18, 1999
- Volumes: 1

The Quest for the Missing Girl (Japanese: 捜索者, Hepburn: Sōsakusha) is a Japanese manga series written and illustrated by Jiro Taniguchi. It was serialized in Shogakukan's Big Comic and published in a single volume in December 1999.

== Publication ==
The series is written and illustrated by Jiro Taniguchi. It was serialized in Big Comic, and published in a single tankōbon volume, which was released on December 18, 1999. The volume was re-released on June 30, 2016, with a new cover.

In April 2007, Fanfare and Ponet Mon announced they licensed the series for English publication.

== Reception ==
The reviewer for Publishers Weekly had mixed feelings about the series. They praised the art while criticizing the plot, stating it "[feels] clumsy in his hand". Ikuko Kitagawa from The Star had similar feelings, stating the appeal of the series comes from "the detailed description of scenery". Unlike previous critics, Scott Green from Ain't It Cool News praised the series as a whole, stating it "distinguishes itself [from other similar works]". Johanna from Comics Worth Reading also offered some praise, stating "this isn't a classic, just an enjoyable book". David Welsh from The Comics Reporter also praised both the art and plot.

In 2009, the series was nominated for the Eisner Award for Best U.S. Edition of International Material—Asia.
