= Samurai Legend =

Japanese manga

- Cover of the 1992 release

風の抄 (Kaze No Shō)
- Genre: Adventure, Martial arts
- Manga
- Written by: Kan Furuyama
- Illustrated by: Jiro Taniguchi
- Published by: Akita Shoten
- English publisher: NA: Central Park Media
- Published: 1992
- Volumes: 1

Samurai Legend (Japanese: 風の抄, Hepburn: Kaze no Shō) is a one-shot Japanese manga written by Kan Furuyama and illustrated by Jiro Taniguchi. The manga is licensed for an English-language release in North America by Central Park Media, licensed for a French-language release in France, Italian-language release in Italy and Portuguese-language release in Brazil by Panini Comics and a Spanish-language release in Spain by Editorial Ivrea.

== Manga ==
Akita Shoten released the manga's single tankōbon originally in September 1992; it was re-released on October 8, 2004. Panini Comics released the manga in France on October 12, 2006, in Italy on August 23, 2005 and in Brazil in June 2006.

== Characters ==
- Lord Mitsuyoshi/Yagyū Jūbei – the protagonist. He is the master of "Yagyu Shinkagery" sword style and the one responsible for guarding the Yagyu Secret Chronicles.
- Lord Gomino – the main antagonist and the former emperor. He resides in Kyoto and attempts to start a rebellion against the Tokugawa bakufu which is the reason as to why he sent his lackey Yashamaro to steal the Yagyu Secret Chronicles.
- Lord Rokumaru – Jubei's younger half-brother and chief monk of the Hotokuji Temple. He aides his brother in retrieving the Yagyu Secret Chronicles.
- Yashamaro – Gomino's ninja whom he sent to steal the Yagyu Secret Chronicles. He is Jubei's foe.
- Yagyū Munenori – Jubei's father and katana instructor for the Shogun and watcher of all feudal lords. He is also the leader of the secret organization of Shadow Yagyu.
- Lady Tsukinowanomiya called Miya-sama (it is one of the ways to address a Prince or Princess of the Imperial Family) – Gomizunono's daughter and granddaughter of Tokugawa Hidetada. She was once the Empress Myosho but retired. She is an old friend of Jubei.
- Katsu Kaishū – the narrator of the story.
