= Sky Hawk (manga) =

Japanese manga series

天の鷹 (Ten no Taka)
- Genre: Western
- Manga
- Written by: Jiro Taniguchi
- Published by: Futabasha
- English publisher: NA: Fanfare/Ponent Mon
- Magazine: Manga Action
- Published: September 28, 2002
- Volumes: 1

Sky Hawk (Japanese: 天の鷹, Hepburn: Ten no Taka) is a Japanese manga series written and illustrated by Jiro Taniguchi. It was serialized in Futabasha's Manga Action and published in a single volume in September 2002.

== Publication ==
The series is written and illustrated by Jiro Taniguchi. It was serialized in Monthly Action and published in a single tankōbon volume on September 28, 2002. Fanfare and Ponent Mon published the series in English.

== Reception ==
A columnist for Manga News stated that while the manga isn't going to blow any minds, it is a solid read. HWR from Anime UK News praised the first volume, calling it "unique". Joseph Arrouet from Planete BD also offered praise for the series, specifically the plot. Christel Scheja from Splash Comics shared the opinion of Arrouet, praising the plot. Sherryn from Manga Sanctuary also praised the plot, while stating that some of the characters are underdeveloped.
