= 2001 Après Jésus Christ =

2001 Après Jésus Christ is a graphic novella written by Jean-Luc Coudray and illustrated by Jean Giraud (also known as Moebius) self-published in 2000 by Giraud's company Stardom. Forty pages long, the book is a fantastical reimagining of the life of Jesus of Nazareth with nineteen full-color illustrations.
