= Bambi and Her Pink Gun =

Japanese manga series

- Cover of the first volume

バンビ (Banbi)
- Genre: Action, Comedy
- Manga
- Written by: Atsushi Kaneko
- Published by: Enterbrain
- English publisher: NA: Digital Manga Publishing
- Magazine: Comic Beam
- Original run: July 1998 – September 2001
- Volumes: 6

Bambi and Her Pink Gun (Japanese: バンビ, Hepburn: Banbi) is a Japanese manga series written and illustrated by Atsushi Kaneko. It centers on a sixteen-year-old girl named Bambi, who has kidnapped a young boy from a crazy vampire star and is taking him back to the 'Old Men'. The story is extremely violent, with every new scene taking on a different look and feel (Western, Latino, the 40s, traditional Japanese, etc.).

Its title came from Sex Pistols' song "Who Killed Bambi?".

== Characters ==
=== Main characters ===
Bambi
An almost primal killer who has no regard for who she slays or why. She knows very little about the human race, and shows a sociopathic lack of emotion or care for anyone else but herself. She always uses the term "Me Bambi" to introduce herself. She is also obsessed with cleanliness; only consuming the cleanest water, freshest fruits and vegetables, and protein powders. Bambi is also a virgin who abstains from sex, calling it a disgusting act, attacking anyone who attempts physical contact with her.
Pampi
A mysterious little boy that Bambi was asked to kidnap from Gabba King and bring to the 'Old Men'. Pampi loves to eat junk food.
Tanahashi
A Twenty-year-old who is traveling the globe to hunt Bambi down. Which side he is on is questionable. Tanahashi was about to be killed by hitmen until Bambi 'saved' his life and set him free, when in actuality she was protecting herself and needed his car. He was aware then of the bounty on her and Pampi's heads and had even made it far enough to Gabba King and became a spy. Although he was hired to kill her, he instead tells her that he is a spy and that he wants to help her. This includes killing a trucker to save her. However, she doesn't take it too well and eventually leaves him.

=== Secondary characters ===
Gabba King
A vampire who is a part time pop singer. He puts out the search notice to have Bambi killed and Pampi brought back for a reward of $500,000,000. His need for Pampi is as much of a mystery as the boy himself. All that is known is that he sees Pampi as "his future". King has a way with women, as his music turns anyone who listens to it on to such a degree that the viewers in a concert will break out into an orgy. He was also rumored to take hundreds of girls every single night and satisfy every one of them. In truth however, he actually beats them to death.
Charlie
Gabba King's drag queen servant. Not much about him is known.
Platinum Mask
He was once a very successful professional wrestler. He is an immortal with a secret deformity under his mask, which he never removes. He has been alive for over a hundred and fifty years, living in the alleys and torturing small animals and killing anyone who crosses his path. His ways of murder are incredibly savage, such as punching off the top of a man's skull, pulling out intestines, and crushing heads with one hand. He is filled with an excessive amount of rage that is so strong and psychotic that even Bambi has a very difficult time defeating him.
Mama
A horrible Western woman and a master of violence with a Rasputin-complex, Mama is the leader of 'Mama's Gang', one of the most notorious gangs in the world. Brutal and an all-around dysfunctional killer, Bambi had to go to the extreme of lighting Mama on fire and finally blowing her up to kill her.
Old Men
Next to nothing is known about them. Gabba King has had problems with them in the past, but has never been able to kill them. They are also shown watching Bambi at various times.

== Release ==
The manga was originally serialized in the magazine Comic Beam by Enterbrain between July 1998 and September 2001. The series was compiled into six tankōbon volumes released by Enterbrain on June 30, 2000, and September 25, 2001. A special edition titled "Rei Alternative" was published by Enterbain on September 27, 2002. On October 25, 2014, the two first volumes of a "remodeled" version of Bambi were released on October 25, 2014; on September 25, 2014, the third and fourth volume were released, and they were followed by the two last on December 25, 2014. An English-language translation was released by Digital Manga Publishing into two volumes in "mid-July 2005" and on December 1, 2005.
