= My Picture Diary =

Japanese manga series

My Picture Diary (Japanese: 私の絵日記, Hepburn: Watashi no Enikki) is a Japanese manga series written and illustrated by Maki Fujiwara (Note: The English edition writes the author's name in Japanese order, Fujiwara Maki.) and published by Chikuma Shobō. The work is presented through illustrated diary entries depicting Fujiwara’s life as a wife and mother dealing with oppressive home life expectations with her young son and withdrawn husband. It was published in English by Drawn and Quarterly in 2023. Ryan Holmberg did the translation.

== Background ==
Holmberg had also translated the works of Fujiwara's husband, Yoshiharu Tsuge, who is depicted in this work.

== Contents ==
Fujiwara married Tsuge, and they had a son, Shōsuke. Fujiwara began drawing a comic about their family life in 1980 as a way to give something to her son. It depicts her domestic life and her marriage. The first entry is set in 1981. Shōsuke is portrayed as a four year old. Terry Hong of Booklist wrote that Fujiwara faced sexism in the "expectations" as her domestic tasks become "suffocating". Fujiwara had been afflicted with cancer and for that time, had it under control. Tsuge ignores Fujiwara, and eventually realizes he needs a form of counseling.

The book has illustrations on the right and summaries and weather forecasts (of each depicted day) on the left. Tsuge stated in an afterword that she always portrayed her husband negatively; this appeared in the book's version in Japan.

The English version has an essay about the artist, written by Holmberg. The essay includes an excerpt of Yoshiharu Tsuge's Diaries, a 1983 work.

== Reception ==
Publishers Weekly stated that the series is "vital and resonant." It stated that the artwork had "carefully observed detail" and that it was "sometimes childlike".

Hong had a positive reception of Holmberg's translation, and he gave the book a starred review.
