= A Distant Neighborhood =

Japanese manga by Jiro Taniguchi

- Cover of volume 1

遥かな町へ (Harukana Machi e)
- Manga
- Written by: Jiro Taniguchi
- Published by: Shogakukan
- English publisher: Fanfare/Ponent Mon
- Magazine: Big Comic
- Original run: 1998 – 1999
- Volumes: 2
- Live-action film

Quartier Lointain / Vertraute Fremde
- Directed by: Sam Garbarski
- Released: 20 May 2010

A Distant Neighborhood (Japanese: 遥かな町へ, Hepburn: Harukana Machi e) is a Japanese manga series by Jiro Taniguchi. It was adapted into a live-action French-Belgian film in 2010.

== Plot ==
Middle-aged salaryman Hiroshi Nakahara accidentally takes a train ride back to his old hometown to visit his mother's grave. Then, for reasons he cannot explain, Hiroshi is transported over 30 years into the past, reacquainting himself with the family he has since lost and the individual memories he has since forgotten.

== Characters ==
- Hiroshi Nakahara – A middle-aged salaryman and the protagonist.
- Daisuke Shimada – One of Hiroshi's school friends (male).
- Kazue Nakahara – Hiroshi's mother.
- Kyoko Nakahara – Hiroshi's younger sister.
- Tomoko Nagase – Hiroshi's female school friend, with whom he went on a movie date.
- Yoshio Nakahara – Hiroshi's father and his mother's second husband.

== See also ==
- 17 Again (2009 film)
- Again!! (2011 manga)
- Erased (2012 manga)
- ReLIFE (2013 manga)
