= Soil (manga) =

Japanese manga series

- Cover of the first volume
- Genre: Crime
- Manga
- Written by: Atsushi Kaneko
- Published by: Enterbrain
- Magazine: Comic Beam
- Original run: 2003 – 2010
- Volumes: 11
- Television drama
- Directed by: Takashi Shimizu; Yūdai Yamaguchi
- Original network: WOWOW
- Original run: March 5, 2010 – April 23, 2010

Soil is a Japanese manga series written and illustrated by Atsushi Kaneko. It was adapted into a Japanese television drama series in 2010. It has been published in French by Ankama.

== Characters ==
- Onoda
- Yokoi (Ryosei Tayama)

== Reception ==
The manga was nominated for Best Crime Comic at the 2012 Angoulême International Comics Festival and for Best Comic at the 2013 edition.
