= The Walking Man (manga) =

Japanese manga series

- Tankōbon volume cover

歩くひと (Aruku Hito)
- Manga
- Written by: Jiro Taniguchi
- Published by: Kodansha
- English publisher: Fanfare/Ponent Mon
- Imprint: Wide KC Party
- Magazine: Morning Party Zōkan
- Original run: 1990 – 1991
- Volumes: 1
- Television drama
- Original network: NHK BS4K
- Original run: April 5, 2020 – 2021
- Episodes: 10
- icon

The Walking Man (Japanese: 歩くひと, Hepburn: Aruku Hito) is a Japanese manga series by Jiro Taniguchi. It was serialized in Kodansha's Morning Party Zōkan from 1990 to 1991. It has been published in English by Fanfare/Ponent Mon and in French by Casterman, and a live-action adaptation aired in Japan in 2020. It was nominated for Best U.S. Edition of International Material—Japan at the 2007 Eisner Awards.

== Synopsis ==
A man walks through his neighborhood and his city, taking time to observe little everyday things.

== Publication ==
The Walking Man was written and illustrated by Jiro Taniguchi. It was serialized in issues 30 to 47 of Kodansha's Morning Party Zōkan between 1990 and 1991. Translations have been licensed and published in English by Fanfare/Ponent Mon and in French by Casterman.

== Media ==
The Walking Man was adapted into a Japanese television drama starring Arata Iura that aired weekly on NHK BS4K beginning April 5, 2020.

== Reception ==
The manga has been described as poetry or meditation and compared to the works of Yasujirō Ozu. In 2007, it was nominated for an Eisner Award in the Best U.S. Edition of International Material—Japan category.
