= Atsushi Kaneko =

Japanese manga artist

- Born: December 26, 1966 (age 59)
- Occupation: Manga artist
- Known for: Bambi and Her Pink Gun; Soil

Atsushi Kaneko (カネコアツシ, Kaneko Atsushi) (born 26 December 1966) is a Japanese manga artist from Sakata, Yamagata Prefecture.

Two of his works, Bambi and Her Pink Gun and Soil, have been published in French. Bambi and Her Pink Gun has been published in English, with Search and Destroy published in English in May 2024. Soil has been adapted into a television drama series.

== Works ==
- Bambi and Her Pink Gun (1998)
- Soil (2004)
- Wet Moon (2011)
- Deathco (2014)
- Search and Destroy (based on Osamu Tezuka's Dororo) (2018)
- Evol (2020)
