= Jiro Taniguchi =

Japanese manga artist

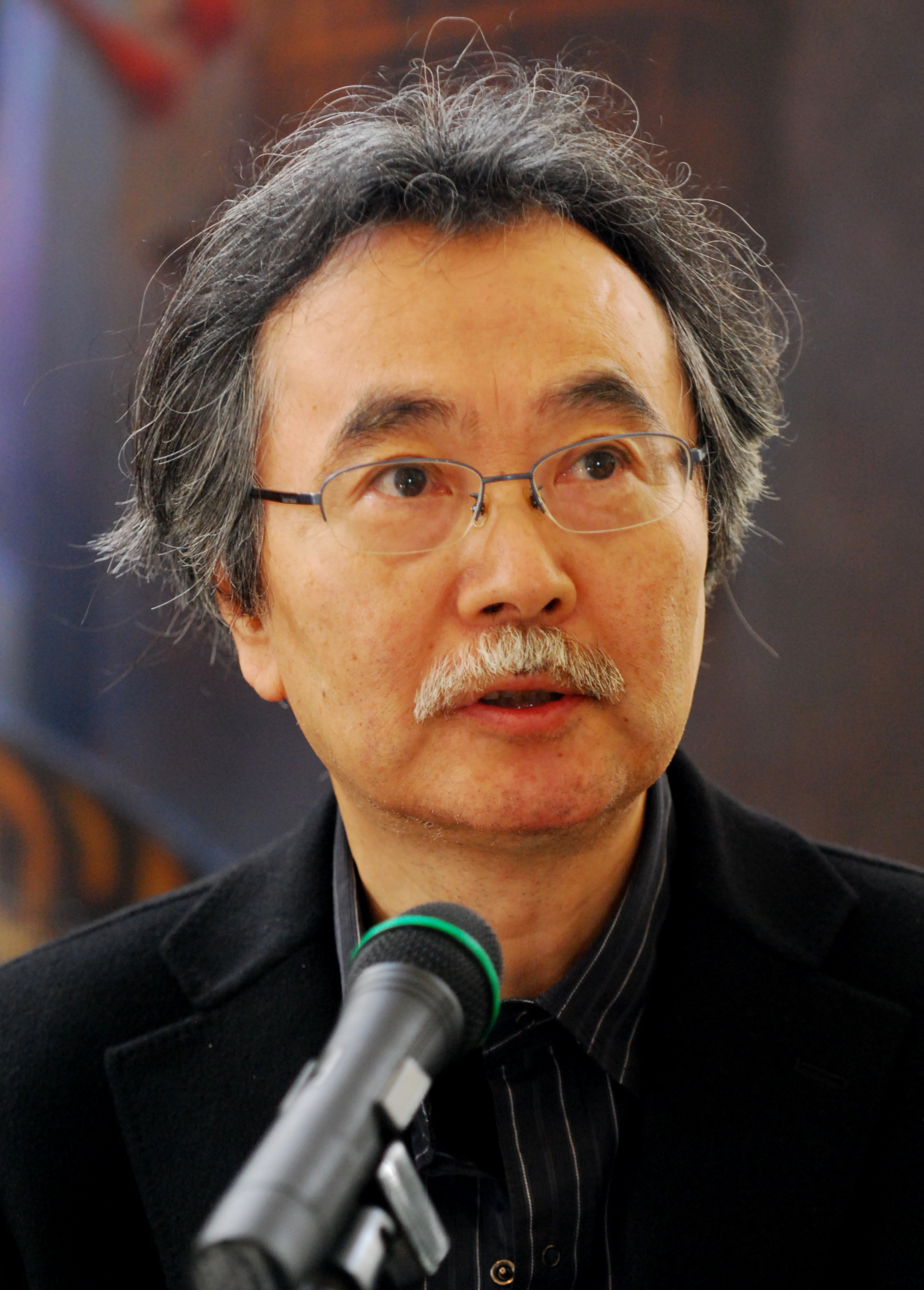
- Taniguchi at Lucca Comics and Games in 2011
- Born: 14 August 1947; Tottori, Tottori, Japan
- Died: 11 February 2017 (aged 69); Tokyo, Japan
- Occupation: Manga artist
- Writing career
- Notable works: A Distant Neighborhood; The Summit of the Gods; A Journal of My Father
- Notable awards: Tezuka Osamu Cultural Prize (1998)

Jiro Taniguchi (谷口 ジロー, Taniguchi Jirō; 14 August 1947 – 11 February 2017) was a Japanese manga writer/artist. His works belong to the gekiga, or "dramatic pictures", genre of manga. In France he was knighted a Chevalier of the Ordre des Arts et des Lettres in 2011.

== Career ==
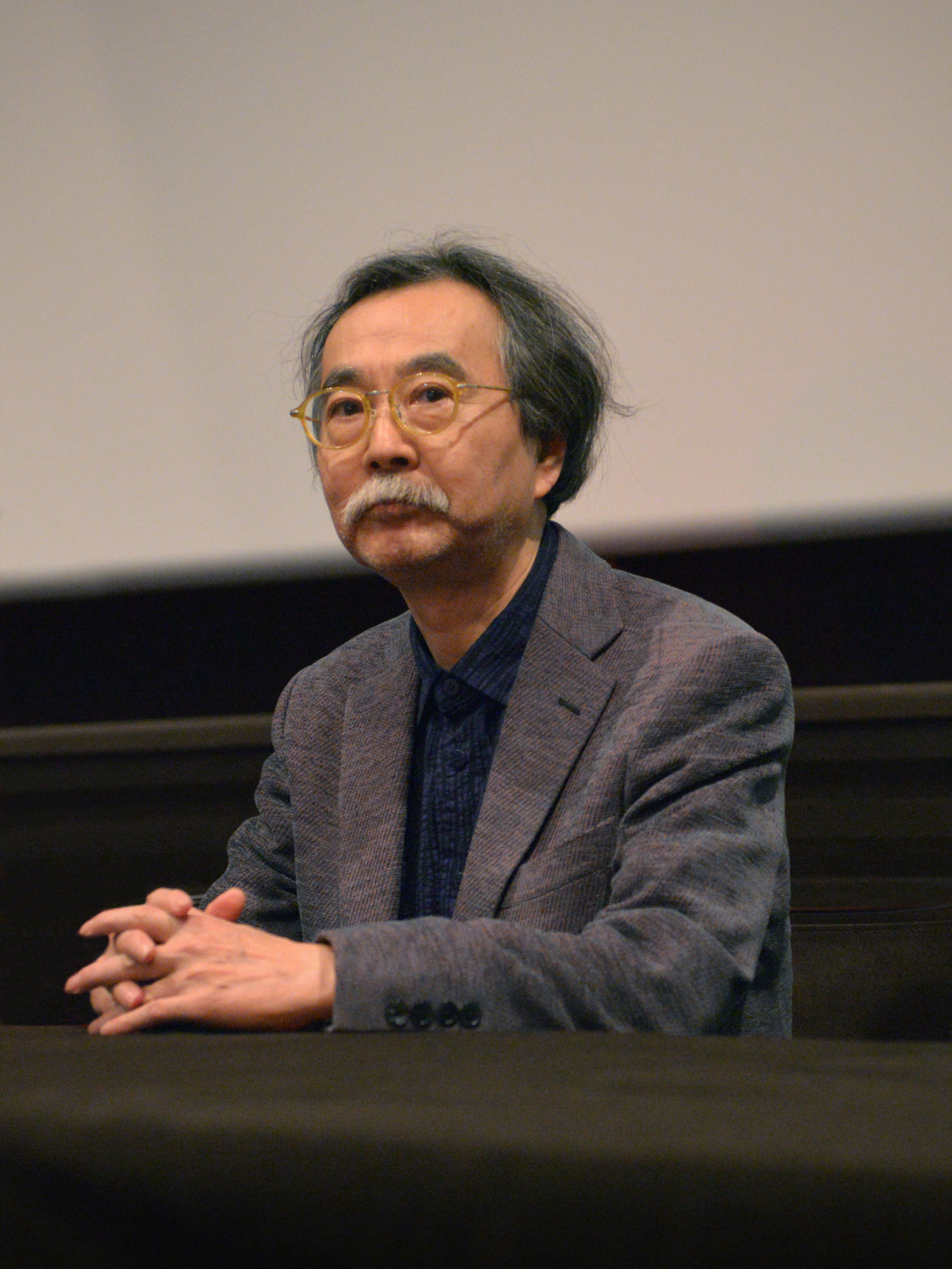
Jiro Taniguchi at Angoulême International Comics Festival in 2015.

Extract from The Walking Man

Taniguchi began his career as an assistant of manga artist Kyūta Ishikawa. He made his manga debut in 1970 with Kareta Heya, published in the magazine Young Comic.

From 1978 to 1986, he created several hard-boiled comics with the scenarist Natsuo Sekigawa, such as City Without Defense, The Wind of the West Is White, and Lindo 3. From 1987 to 1996, Taniguchi and Natsuo Sekigawa produced the 5-volume series The Times of Botchan. In the 1990s, he came up with several albums, among which were Aruku Hito (歩くひと), A Journal of My Father (父の暦, Chichi no Koyomi), and Hitobito Shirīzu: Keyaki no Ki (人びとシリーズ「けやきのき」).

From 1980 to 1983, he collaborated with Garon Tsuchiya for the manga Blue Fighter (青の戦士, Ao no Senshi), Knuckle Wars (ナックル・ウォーズ, Nakkuru Wōzu), and Live! Odyssey (LIVE! オデッセイ).

He illustrated Baku Yumemakura's works, Garōden from 1989 to 1990 and The Summit of the Gods from 2000 to 2003. He later received awards at the Angoulême International Comics Festival in 2002 and 2005. For The Summit of the Gods, he hiked to Kathmandu, Nepal, for research.

In 1997, he created the Icaro series with texts by Moebius.

Jiro Taniguchi gained several prizes for his work. Among others, the Tezuka Osamu Cultural Prize (1998) for the series The Times of Botchan, the Shogakukan Manga Award with Inu o Kau, and in 2003, the Alph'Art of the best scenario at the Angoulême International Comics Festival for A Distant Neighborhood. His work has been translated in many languages. The majority of his English translated books have been published by Fanfare/Ponent Mon. Mexican filmmaker Guillermo del Toro praised his work, stating that "Taniguchi was a manga poet, the Kieslowski of the page and a serene, profound observer of the world".

A Distant Neighborhood was adapted into a live-action Belgian film in 2010.

In 2014, Taniguchi visited the Louis Vuitton writing cabinet in St Germain des Prés, Paris to celebrate his Venice contribution to the Louis Vuitton Travel Book series that launched in 2013. While there, he was interviewed by local Parisian blogger, whose nom de plume is Tokyobanhbao.

In 2016, an excerpt of The Walking Man was featured at the Museum für Kunst und Gewerbe Hamburg as part of the "Hokusai X Manga: Japanese Pop Culture since 1680" exhibit. An accompanying catalog book was published that same year.

Taniguchi has cited Hiroshi Hirata, Takao Saito, Moribi Murano, and Kyūta Ishikawa as major influences.

Taniguchi died on 11 February 2017 in Tokyo, at the age of 69.

== Selected works ==
Year	Series	Notes
1981	Jiken ya Kagyō	
1983	Shin Jiken ya Kagyō	
1986	Hotel Harbour View	
1987	The Times of Botchan	Based on Botchan by Natsume Sōseki
1988	K	
1990	Garōden	Based on a novel by Baku Yumemakura
1992	The Walking Man	
1992	Samurai Legend	
1994	A Journal of My Father	
1996	Benkei in New York	
1997	Kodoku no Gourmet	
1998	A Distant Neighborhood	
1999	The Quest for the Missing Girl	
2000	Icaro	
2000	The Summit of the Gods	Based on a novel by Baku Yumemakura
2002	Sky Hawk	
2004	The Ice Wanderer	
2005	Hare Yuku Sora	
2008	A Zoo in Winter	
2012	Furari	
2014	Guardians of the Louvre	
2014	Venice	Art book

== Legacy ==
Jiro Taniguchi's death was announced by his publisher, Casterman, and which described the artist as "deeply kind and gentle". Taniguchi's art inspired scholarship in a variety of ways, including academic presentations, museum exhibits, articles, and academic book entries.

In 2020, Taniguchi was highlighted in chapter 10 of a compiled book Comics Studies here and now titled, "Jirō Taniguchi: France's Mangaka". 2021 was an impactful year for those inspired by Taniguchi. At the Cannes Film Festival, an anime film adaptation of Taniguchi's art from The Summit of the Gods was featured. Shortly after, Fusanosuke Natsume, along with two other scholars from Portland State University wrote an article titled, "Time to Re-Evaluate Taniguchi Jiro's Pace in Manga", reviewing Taniguchi's work alongside contemporary manga. Later that same year, the "Jiro Taniguchi Exhibition" was launched at the Setagaya Literary Museum, showing from October 2021 to February 2022. In March 2022, due to the opening of a new bandes dessinées bookstore in Tokyo's Kita Ward, The Japan News mentioned Taniguchi and his most popular manga. Then, in June 2022, the Kyoto International Manga Museum held an exhibition titled, "The Man Who Draws: Jiro Taniguchi". Four days after his death, a writer for The Comics Journal wrote a brief obituary for Taniguchi. In January 2023, the same journal translated an essay titled, "Taniguchi Jirō and His Gekiga Years", by Fusanosuke Natsume. 2024 saw the release of a Japanese live-action film adaptation of The Solitary Gourmet (Kodoku no Gourmet).

Since 2021, Japan has been reprinting new editions of "The Jiro Taniguchi Collection" into English translations as "an investment in ensuring the continuance of Taniguchi's legacy."
