= Michael Arias =

American-born Japanese film director and producer (born 1968)

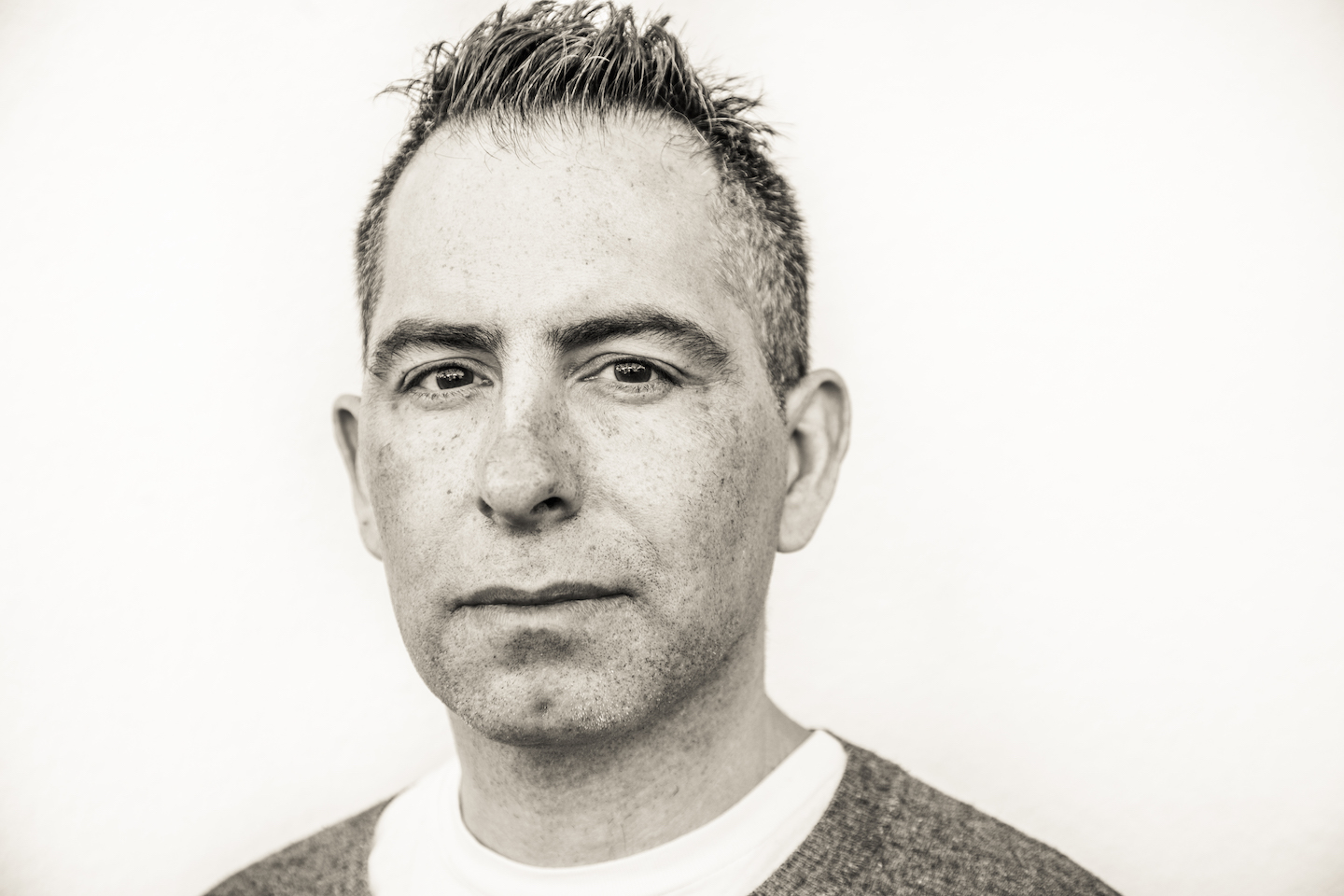
- Arias in 2017
- Born: February 2, 1968 (age 58); Los Angeles, California, U.S.
- Occupations: Visual effects artist, producer, director
- Years active: 1987–present
- Website: http://michaelarias.net/

Michael Arias (born 1968) is an American visual effects artist, producer, and director. He is best known for his directorial debut, the anime feature Tekkonkinkreet, which established him as the first non-Japanese director of a major anime film.

== Early life ==
Michael Arias was born in Los Angeles, California. His father, Ron Arias (born 1941) is a former senior writer and correspondent for People magazine and a highly regarded Chicano writer. Michael Arias' mother, Dr. Joan Arias, was a professor of Spanish and IBM Software Sales Specialist.

When still a young boy, Arias often watched movies in the theater with his parents and borrowed 16mm prints from a local public library for screening at home; it was at this stage in his life that he developed his passion for cinema.

Arias graduated from the Webb School of California at the age of 16. He then attended Wesleyan University in Connecticut, majoring in linguistics for two years, before dropping out to pursue a career as a musician. Michael's early musical associates include Moby and Margaret Fiedler McGinnis.

Soon after quitting Wesleyan, Arias moved to Los Angeles, abandoned his musical ambitions and, through the efforts of a family friend, began working in the film industry.

== Career ==
=== Early filmmaking career ===
Michael Arias' early filmmaking career is marked by stints in both the U.S. and Japan, working in VFX, CG production and software development, and as a producer of animated films.

==== Dream Quest Images ====
Michael Arias began his film career in 1987 at nascent visual effects powerhouse Dream Quest Images (DQ), first as an unpaid intern and then as a full-time employee and IATSE member. The bulk of his time at DQ was spent as a camera assistant on the motion control stages, working on such effects-heavy Hollywood films as The Abyss, Total Recall, and Fat Man and Little Boy.

At the time, the visual effects industry had only just begun adopting digital technologies, and analog techniques such as motion control and stop motion photography, miniatures, optical compositing, matte painting, and pyrotechnics still dominated. Arias, by his own account, flourished in the hands-on environment of DQ ("a big tinkertoy factory run by car nuts and mad bikers").

==== Back To The Future: The Ride ====
After two years of working at Dream Quest, Arias returned to the East Coast with the intention of finishing his studies, this time at NYU's Music Technology program. Soon after enrolling though, Arias was contacted by visual effects veteran and fellow Abyss alumnus Susan Sitnek, who invited Arias to join the crew of Universal Studios' immersive attraction Back To The Future: The Ride (BTTFTR), helmed by visual effects legend Douglas Trumbull. Once relocated to the Berkshires, where pre-production was underway, Arias was drafted by Trumbull to animate the attraction's flight-simulator-style ride vehicles. Of his time working under Trumbull, Arias recalls, "Doug was – IS – such an inspiring figure. For me and the other younger crew, including John Gaeta, now VFX Supervisor on the Matrix films, Doug was so generous with his knowledge; such a very warm and receptive and articulate and creative guy."

Arias' association with Trumbull proved fortuitous, not only for the experience of working daily with Trumbull himself, but also because it resulted in what would be Arias' first trip to Japan, with Trumbull, with whom he toured the Osaka Expo and visited post-production monolith Imagica and video game giant Sega Enterprises. That first visit, combined with Arias' friendship with key members of BTTFTR's largely Japanese modelmaking crew, set the stage for Arias' subsequent long-term stay in Japan.

==== Imagica and Sega Enterprises ====
In 1991 Arias accepted an offer to work as a motion-control camera operator in Imagica's Special Effects department, and moved to Tokyo. Then, after less than a year at Imagica, he was invited by up-and-coming game producer Tetsuya Mizuguchi to join a newly formed computer graphics unit at Sega Enterprises Amusement Research and Development facility. At Sega, Arias co-directed and animated the ridefilm Megalopolice: Tokyo City Battle (featured in SIGGRAPH 1993's Electronic Theater).

==== Syzygy Digital Cinema ====
In 1993 Arias returned to the US and teamed up with renowned New York City title designers Randall Balsmeyer & Mimi Everett, with whom he co-founded CG design boutique Syzygy Digital Cinema, creators of digital sequences for David Cronenberg's M. Butterfly, Joel and Ethan Coen's The Hudsucker Proxy, Robert Altman's Prêt-à-Porter, and Spike Lee's Crooklyn and Clockers. Their title sequence for M. Butterfly was honored by inclusion in the SIGGRAPH 1994 Screening Room and Montreal's Cinéma Du Futur festival of the same year.

==== Softimage ====
Exhausted by the demands of production and hoping to gain further experience developing computer graphics software, Arias accepted an offer from 3D-animation software innovator Softimage to join their newly formed Special Projects group, a "S.W.A.T." team of artists and engineers established to assist key high-end customers on-site.

Encouraged by colleagues, Arias quickly immersed himself in the Mental Ray rendering API and thereafter began experimenting with techniques for simulating traditional animation imagery using computer graphics tools. This research led to Arias' developing and eventually patenting Softimage's Toon Shaders, rendering software for facilitating integration of computer graphics imagery with cel animation. Newly minted Toon Shaders in hand, Arias worked closely with the staff of DreamWorks Animation and Studio Ghibli to add a distinct visual flavor to the traditional/digital hybrid animation of films Prince Of Egypt, The Road to El Dorado, and Hayao Miyazaki's Princess Mononoke (もののけ姫, Mononoke-hime) and Spirited Away (千と千尋の神隠し, Sen to Chihiro no Kamikakushi).

==== Tekkonkinkreet Pilot Film ====
In 1995, after establishing himself definitively in Tokyo, Arias was introduced by a friend to Taiyō Matsumoto's manga Tekkonkinkreet (鉄コン筋クリート, Tekkon Kinkurīto), a work that profoundly affected him. Tekkonkinkreet (Tekkon) is a metaphysical coming-of-age story concerning two orphans, Black (クロ, Kuro) and White (シロ, Shiro) and their struggle to survive in a pan-Asian metropolis, Treasure Town (宝町, Takara-machi), beset by evil. Of first discovering Tekkon, Arias recalls that a friend loaned him Tekkon to read, "And that was it. Hooked. ... I cried many times reading it, also a new experience for me to be moved to tears by a manga."

In November 1997, a conversation with animation auteur Kōji Morimoto, who had shown interest in Arias' software projects, led to Arias' introduction to manga artist Taiyō Matsumoto. From there, what had begun as a simple software demo for Morimoto rapidly escalated to a full-fledged all-CG feature-film project, helmed by Morimoto, with computer graphics efforts directed by Arias himself.

Though the completed 4-minute Tekkonkinkreet Pilot Film (「鉄コン筋クリート」パイロット版, Tekkonkinkurīto Pairottoban) went on to take an Outstanding Performance award for Non-Interactive Digital Art at the Japan Media Arts Festival and be featured in the SIGGRAPH 2000 Animation Theater', the project was abandoned shortly thereafter for lack of funding and director Morimoto's flagging interest in Tekkonkinkreet.

==== The Animatrix ====
Then, in 2000, while still under contract to Softimage, Michael accepted an invitation from Joel Silver and Lilly and Lana Wachowski (the Wachowskis) to produce Warner Bros' Matrix-inspired animation anthology The Animatrix, a project that consumed him for over three years. On being pegged to produce The Animatrix, despite his lack of experience producing, Arias recounts, "I really had to draw on a great deal of experience that had sat unused in the background while I'd been pursuing software development. Everything I'd learned until this point: a brief career in recording studios, composing music and doing sound effects for short films in college, having my own company, working in special effects. It was a great chance to exercise some dormant (or damaged) brain cells."

Arias worked closely with the Wachowskis to refine the project's unique specifications: though initially conceived of as a television series, The Animatrix evolved into a collection of nine non-episodic animated shorts, each six to ten minutes long. With co-producers Hiroaki Takeuchi and Eiko Tanaka (president of maverick animation boutique Studio 4°C, where much of The Animatrix was animated), Arias ultimately developed and produced eight of the nine Animatrix segments (the lone exception being a CG-animated short created by Square Pictures). To helm the films, Arias and his partners assembled a "dream team" of anime luminaries that included Yoshiaki Kawajiri, Kōji Morimoto, Shinichiro Watanabe, and Mahiro Maeda.

The Animatrix was a commercial success and went on garner the 2004 ASIFA Annie Award for Outstanding Achievement in an Animated Home Entertainment Production.

=== Recent filmmaking career ===
Michael Arias' recent career has been focused primarily on directing.

==== Tekkonkinkreet ====
In 2003, while working on The Animatrix, Arias picked up Tekkonkinkreet again. Armed with an English-language screenplay penned by screenwriter Anthony Weintraub, and encouraged by mentor Morimoto, Arias moved forward with plans to revive Tekkon at Studio 4°C, with Animatrix collaborator and 4 °C president Eiko Tanaka producing and Arias directing.

The film was completed in August 2006 and premiered at the Tokyo International Film Festival soon thereafter.

Museum of Modern Art (MoMA) curator Barbara London named Tekkonkinkreet "Best Film of 2006" in her Art Forum roundup, and subsequently arranged for the film's North American premiere to be held at MoMA.

With his adaptation of Tekkonkinkreet, Arias, with Production Designer Shinji Kimura, had re-imagined the manga's Treasure Town as a chaotic pan-Asian hybrid, part Hong Kong, part Bombay, with futuristic and industrial elements densely layered over a foundation that borrowed much from images of Shōwa-era Tokyo. New York Times critic Manohla Dargis, in her review of Tekkonkinkreet, describes Treasure Town as "a surreal explosion of skewed angles, leaning towers, hanging wires, narrow alleys and gaudily cute flourishes that bring to mind a yakuza cityscape by way of a Hello Kitty theme park." Indeed, Tekkon's sumptuous art direction was widely praised, with Production Designer Kimura receiving the Best Art Direction award at the 2008 Tokyo International Anime Fair. Tekkon was further lauded, not only for Arias' innovative use of computer graphics techniques and seamless integration of digital and traditional animation, but also for the film's handmade, documentary-style approach to storytelling. After an early Tekkon screening at the Los Angeles Asian Pacific Film Festival, filmjourney.org editor Doug Cummings elaborated:

Arias' angles and compositions are uniformally [sic] inventive and striking, and most impressively, he incorporates a bevy of live action camera techniques: handheld framing, long tracking shots through corridors, rack focusing and shifting depths of field–that generate considerable immediacy and environmental realism (despite the obvious hand-drawn artifice). More than simple technological advances, these elements have long been untapped by feature animation due to their inability to be storyboarded – they're traditional luxuries of live action spontaneity. For all the accolades bestowed upon Alfonso Cuarón's digitally-composited tracking shots in Children of Men, Arias' techniques here are arguably greater achievements.

Though Tekkonkinkreet was considered a hit locally and generally well-received by critics and audiences worldwide (particularly in France, where author Taiyō Matsumoto's work is well known among manga readers), North American anime fans questioned Arias' filmmaking credentials and criticized his decidedly non-purist approach to adapting manga to anime (including his decision to work from Anthony Weintraub's English-language screenplay rather than a Japanese text). Online animation forum Animation Insider pointedly asked, "What in the hell does Michael Arias think he's doing?"

In defense of Weintraub's screenplay, Arias explained to readers of AniPages Daily, "He really got it right – the story of Treasure Town, the sense of doom, the action in Kiddie Kastle all fit together very seamlessly." Regarding Tekkonkinkreet's evident subversion of (so-called) traditional animation conventions, he added, "I wanted to do things differently.... Ōtomo once said to me and [chief animation director] Nishimi, 'if you're not doing things differently you shouldn't even bother'."

In the final analysis, Tekkonkinkreet remains a milestone in Japanese animation. It was awarded Japan's prestigious Ōfuji Noburō Award at home, and continued on to compete for two awards at the 57th Berlin International Film Festival and later win the 2008 Japan Academy Prize for Animation of the Year. The Guardian listed Tekkonkinkreet third in its roundup of the ten most underrated movies of the decade.

==== Association with Asmik Ace ====
Summer 2007 was marked by the formalization of the long-standing relationship between Arias and the Japanese film distribution and production company Asmik Ace Entertainment. Arias is the first to join the roster of Asmik's artist management division.

==== Short film: Okkakekko ====
Shortly after finishing publicity for Tekkonkinkreet, Arias began work writing and directing Hide and Seek (おっかけっこ, Okkakekko), one of fifteen 1-minute animated shorts comprising the NHK animation anthology Ani-kuri (アニクリ, Ani-kuri). Individual segments were streamed from the official Ani*Kuri15 website, and broadcast piecemeal starting in May 2007.

Arias created the film at Studio4°C, calling on animation prodigy Takayuki Hamada (one of Tekkon's lead animators) to design and animate characters. Other contributors to Arias' Ani*Kuri short include colorist Miyuki Itō, CG director Takuma Sakamoto, British electronic music composers Plaid, and Sound designer Mitch Osias, all Tekkonkinkreet alumni. Tekkon chief animation director Shōjirō Nishimi and production designer Shinji Kimura each directed his own Ani*Kuri segment, and other directors included Satoshi Kon, Mamoru Oshii, and Mahiro Maeda.

The entire collection of fifteen Anikuri shorts has since been released as a DVD-book set, featuring production detail, creator interviews, and storyboard and background artwork.

==== Heaven's Door ====
In 2007 Arias began work on Heaven's Door, a Japanese live-action feature film loosely based on the German hit Knockin' on Heaven's Door directed by Thomas Jahn and written by Jahn and actor Til Schweiger. Arias' adaptation features J-Pop heartthrob Tomoya Nagase and ingenue Mayuko Fukuda as unlikely comrades who flee the hospital where they first meet, and embark on a road-trip to reach the ocean and watch the sun set there in the short time they have left.

Heaven's Door marks the return of Arias' Tekkonkinkreet collaborators Min Tanaka (the voice of Tekkonkinkreet's "Suzuki"), composers Plaid, and Sound Designer Mitch Osias.

Heaven's Door was released in Japanese theaters on February 7, 2009, to mixed press and lukewarm box office, but was praised for its cast, music, cinematography, and sound design. Screen International correspondent Jason Gray concludes, "I think younger audiences will find the tragedy of Heaven´s Door palpable.... For someone like me who devoured American cinema of the early 70s, tearing up at films like Thunderbolt and Lightfoot, I might not be the best judge. Who knows, Heaven's Door may become the new Léon for the teen set here and regarded as a minor indie classic overseas."

==== Short film: Hope ====
On June 23, 2009, Japanese pay-per-view broadcaster WOWOW announced the upcoming on-air premiere of Arias' surreal short film Hope, featuring popular actress Juri Ueno as a struggling animator trapped overnight in an elevator.

Hope was penned by Arisa Kaneko, shot by Heaven's Door DP Takashi Komatsu, J.S.C., and features original score by Plaid and sound design by Mitch Osias.

The animation studio interiors were shot on location at Tokyo's Madhouse studios, while veteran production designer (and frequent Sōgo Ishii collaborator) Toshihiro Isomi created a rotating set for Miyuki's elevator on a Yokohama soundstage.

==== Harmony ====
On November 27, 2014, Japanese broadcaster Fuji Television made public Arias' co-directing (with Takashi Nakamura) the feature-film adaptation of the late Project Itoh's dystopian sci-fi novel Harmony, recipient of a Philip K. Dick Award Special Citation in 2010. At the time of Fuji Television's statement, production was ongoing at Studio 4°C with the film slated for a 2015 theatrical release. Harmony was released in Japan on November 13, 2015, and internationally in the Spring of 2016. The film was praised for its innovative visuals and novel mixture of science fiction action and philosophical rumination, but at the same time criticized for its profusion of cerebral digressions.

==== Tokyo Alien Bros. ====
In May 2018 Nippon Television announced a live-action television series adaptation of Keigo Shinzō's manga Tokyo Alien Bros., co-directed by Michael Arias and veteran dorama director Shintaro Sugawara and written by Shō Kataoka. NTV broadcast the series weekly beginning on July 23, 2018, and ending with the tenth and final episode on September 24, 2018. For director Arias Tokyo Alien Bros. marked both a return to live-action filmmaking and a reunion with frequent collaborators Plaid and director of photography Takashi Komatsu.

=== Translator of works by Taiyō Matsumoto ===
Michael Arias has translated and adapted to English some of Tekkonkinkreet author Taiyō Matsumoto's manga.

==== Sunny ====
Arias' English translation of Taiyō Matsumoto's quasi-autobiographical manga Sunny was included in the Young Adult Library Services Association's Great Graphic Novels list for 2014, and awarded the Best Graphic Novel prize by the Slate Book Review and the Center for Cartoon Studies.

==== Cats of the Louvre ====
Arias is also credited with the 2019 English translation and adaptation of Matsumoto's surreal tale of anthropomorphized stray cats Cats of the Louvre for publisher Viz's Signature collection, recipient of the Eisner Award for Best U.S. Edition of International Material – Asia.

==== Ping Pong ====
In 2020 Viz published Arias' English translation of the full two-volume edition of Ping Pong, Matsumoto's popular high school table tennis epic.

==== No. 5 ====
In 2021 Viz announced a forthcoming English-language edition of No. 5, Matsumoto's surreal sci-fi saga, also translated by Arias.

==== Tokyo These Days ====
In 2024 Viz began publishing Arias' English translation of Matsumoto's slice-of-life meditation on the struggle between art and commerce. The series went on to win the 2025 Eisner Award for Best U.S. Edition of International Material—Asia.

== Personal life ==
Arias has lived in Tokyo, Japan since he was 23 and speaks and writes Japanese fluently.

In 2011 Arias documented his experiences providing relief to relatives in Miyagi Prefecture during the days immediately following the Tōhoku earthquake and tsunami.

== Filmography ==
Film
Year	Title	Role	Notes
1989	The Abyss	Motion control cameraperson (uncredited)	
1989	Fat Man and Little Boy	Motion control cameraperson (uncredited)	
1991	Back To The Future: The Ride	Ride programmer (uncredited)	
1993	M. Butterfly	Title sequence computer graphics (as Syzygy Digital Cinema)	
1994	The Hudsucker Proxy	Title sequence and newsreel sequence computer graphics (as Syzygy Digital Cinema)	
2003	The Animatrix	Producer, computer graphics, additional sequence director, voice cast	2004 ASIFA Annie for Outstanding Achievement in an Animated Home Entertainment Production.
2006	Tekkonkinkreet (鉄コン筋クリート, Tekkon Kinkurīto)	Director, storyboard artist, additional voices	2006 Mainichi Film Concours Noburō Ōfuji award for excellence in animation 2008 Japan Academy Prize for Animation of the Year. 57th Berlin International Film Festival Generation 14plus and Best First Feature nominations Gertie Award Jury Special Mention—40th Sitges Film Festival; Gran Prix—Anima 2008 festival in Brussels, Belgium; Golden Prize for Best Animated / Stop Motion Film—2007 Fantasia International Film Festival; Animation Unlimited screening—31st Hong Kong International Film Festival; Panorama Selection—2007 Deauville Asian Film Festival; 2007 Nippon Connection Film Festival in Frankfurt, Germany; 2007 Camera Japan Festival in the Netherlands; Nippon Cinema program—2010 Nippon Connection Film Festival in Frankfurt, Germany; Lancia Platinum Grand Prize Special Mention—2008 Future Film Festival in Bologna, Italy
2007	Hide and Seek (おっかけっこ, Okkakekko)	Director, writer, storyboard artist	TV short film featured on Ani*Kuri15
2009	Heaven's Door	Director	Nippon Cinema program—2010 Nippon Connection Film Festival in Frankfurt, Germany
2009	Hope	Director	
2010	Team Dragon from AKB48 Wings Of The Heart (心の羽根, Kokoronohane)	Director, visual effects supervisor	Music video for Dragon Ball Kai (ドラゴンボール改(カイ), Doragon Bōru Kai; lit. 'Dragon Ball Revised') theme music
2015	Harmony	Director (with Takashi Nakamura)	Feature-film adaptation of Project Itoh's novel
2018	Tokyo Alien Bros.	Director (with Shintaro Sugawara)	10-episode TV-series adaptation of Keigo Shinzō's manga
2019	Make Art Not Friends	Director, producer, production designer	Live-action music video included in the visual companion piece to singer/songwriter Sturgill Simpson's Sound & Fury album.
2023	Godzilla Minus One	Actor (American serviceman), montage supervisor (モンタージュ監修)	

== Achievements and recognitions ==
- At SIGGRAPH 1996 Arias presented the technical sketch "Toon Shaders for Simulating Cel Animation" detailing his work on rendering software for use in simulating the appearance of cel animation.
- Arias was Guest Editor of the SIGGRAPH Computer Graphics journal, Volume 32, Number 1, published February 1999. The issue focused on non-photorealistic rendering (NPR).
- On October 12, 1999, the United States Patent and Trademark Office awarded Arias U.S. Patent 5,966,134 for invention of a technique for simulating cel animation and shading.
- Arias was a contributor to the Animation and Special Effects program of SIGGRAPH 2000. As a member of the panel "Digital Cel Animation in Japan", Arias presented his work on the Tekkonkinkreet pilot and, with moderator Ken Anjyo and co-panelists Youichi Horry and Yoshiyuki Momose, discussed historical developments, cultural influences, and technical innovations particular to Japanese animation.
- Arias is a member of the Academy of Motion Picture Arts and Sciences Short Film and Feature Animation Branch and the Visual Effects Society.
- Arias has served on the juries for the SIGGRAPH (2013) and SIGGRAPH Asia (2015 and 2016) computer animation festivals.
