= Francofonia =

2015 film

- Film poster
- Directed by: Alexander Sokurov
- Written by: Alexander Sokurov
- Produced by: Thomas Kufus; Els Vandevorst
- Starring: Louis-Do de Lencquesaing; Benjamin Utzerath; Vincent Nemeth; Johanna Korthals Altes; Andrey Chelpanov; Jean-Claude Caër
- Narrated by: Alexander Sokurov
- Cinematography: Bruno Delbonnel
- Edited by: Hansjörg Weißbrich; Aleksey Yankovskiy
- Music by: Murat Kabardokov
- Production companies: Idéale Audience; Zero One Film; N279 Entertainment; Arte France Cinéma; Musée du Louvre
- Distributed by: Sophie Dulac Distribution (France)
- Release dates: 4 September 2015 (Venice); 11 November 2015 (France)
- Running time: 90 minutes
- Countries: France; Germany; Netherlands
- Languages: Russian; French; German
- Box office: $1,008,154

Francofonia is a 2015 docudrama film written and directed by Alexander Sokurov. It follows the Louvre's collection evacuation during the World War II, led by Jacques Jaujard, and how the past and present of the museum is directly connected to this moment.

The film had its world premiere in the main competition of the 72nd Venice International Film Festival on 4 September 2015, where it was nominated for the Golden Lion. It was theatrically released in France on 11 November 2015.

== Cast ==
- Louis-Do de Lencquesaing as Jacques Jaujard
- Benjamin Utzerath as Franz von Wolff-Metternich
- Alexander Sokurov as himself
- Vincent Nemeth as Napoléon Bonaparte
- Johanna Korthals Altes as Marianne

== Release ==
It was screened in the main competition section of the 72nd Venice International Film Festival and in the Masters section of the 2015 Toronto International Film Festival. The film won the Mimmo Rotella Award at Venice. Variety defined it as a "dense, enriching meditation on the Louvre and specifically (but not exclusively) the museum’s status during WWII".

== Reception ==
=== Critical response ===
Francofonia has an approval rating of 87% on review aggregator website Rotten Tomatoes, based on 77 reviews, and an average rating of 7/10. The website's critical consensus states, "Francofonia may test the patience of the uninitiated, but viewers willing to delve into a beautifully filmed look at the intersection of art and war will be richly rewarded". It also has a score of 71 out of 100 on Metacritic, based on 25 critics, indicating "generally favorable reviews".

=== Awards and nominations ===
Awards
| Award | Category | Recipients and nominees | Result |
|---|---|---|---|
| 72nd Venice International Film Festival | Golden Lion | Alexander Sokurov | Nominated |
| 72nd Venice International Film Festival | Mimmo Rotella Award | Alexander Sokurov | Won |
| 72nd Venice International Film Festival | Green Drop Award | Alexander Sokurov | Nominated |
