= Caroline Baron =

American film producer

- Education: Brandeis University
- Occupation: Filmmaker
- Years active: 1983–present
- Notable work: Capote, Monsoon Wedding, Being Flynn, Admission, The Wonder Years, Mozart in the Jungle
- Spouse: Anthony Weintraub
- Children: 2

Caroline Baron is an American film producer and philanthropist. She is best known for producing Mozart in the Jungle (2014), Capote (2005), and Monsoon Wedding (2001). Baron received an Academy Award nomination for producing Capote and is a member of the Academy of Motion Picture Arts and Sciences.

Baron founded FilmAid International in 1999, an organization dedicated to helping refugees and other communities around the world through the use of film.

Baron is an adjunct professor at New York University's Tisch School of the Arts in the undergraduate film program.

== Film career ==
Baron began her career as a production manager for the film The Toxic Avenger (1984). She was an associate producer on the television series The Wonder Years from 1988 to 1989.

Her producing work includes The Santa Clause (1994), Monsoon Wedding (2001), Capote (2005), Being Flynn (2012), Admission (2013), A Master Builder (2013), and the Amazon Studios original series Mozart in the Jungle.

Baron founded her production company named A-Line Pictures in 2005 with her husband, screenwriter and director Anthony Weintraub. A-Line was the co-production company for Capote.

== Yummico ==
Baron currently supervises production for the children's media company Yummico. She founded the company with creators Anthony Weintraub, Bob Mowen, and Traci Paige Johnson, who is best known for creating the television series Blue's Clues.

== FilmAid ==
After hearing about the 1999 Kosovo War, Baron founded FilmAid International. The organization started by assisting refugees in Macedonia through the use of educational films and entertainment.

"I learned very quickly that we could use the screens for more than entertainment," Baron stated in a Vanity Fair article. "We could also communicate life-saving education. We were drawing huge crowds, and everyone wanted to see what was being projected."

In 1999, Film Aid partnered with the United Nations High Commissioner for Refugees (UNHCR) and other global aid organizations to assist refugees in countries around the world, including Guinea, Kenya, Afghanistan, Thailand, and Haiti.

== Personal life ==
Baron lives in New York City with her husband Anthony Weintraub and her two kids, Asher and Emmanuel. Anthony Weintraub is a writer and director best known for writing the animated film adaptation of Tekkonkinkreet (2006). Baron's son Asher is the creator of the Menurkey, a menorah shaped like a turkey for Thanksgivukkah.

== Filmography ==
Year	Format	Film	Role
1984	Film	The Toxic Avenger	Production Manager
1989	Film	Shag	Production Manager
1993	Film	Indian Summer	Co-producer, Production Manager
1994	Film	The Santa Clause	Co-producer, Unit Production Manager
1988-1989	TV series	The Wonder Years	Associate producer
1990	TV series documentary	American Masters - Preston Sturges: The Rise and Fall of the American Dreamer	Co-producer
1991	Film	Don't Tell Mom the Babysitter's Dead	Associate producer
1992	Film	Crossing the Bridge	Co-producer, Production Manager
1992	Film	The Opposite Sex and How to Live with Them	Co-producer
1995	Film	Home for the Holidays	Unit Production Manager
1996	Film	Kama Sutra: A Tale of Love	Co-producer
1997	Short Film	Michael Jackson's Ghosts	Executive producer
1997	Film	Addicted to Love	Co-producer, Unit Production Manager
1998	TV movie	Witness to the Mob	Producer
1999	Film	Flawless	Co-producer
2000	Film	Center Stage	Co-producer
2001	Film	Monsoon Wedding	Producer
2005	Film	Capote	Producer, Unit Production Manager
2011	TV series	Untitled Jersey Project	Producer
2012	Film	Being Flynn	Executive producer, Unit Production Manager
2013	Film	Admission	Executive producer, Unit Production Manager
2013	Film	A Master Builder	Co-Executive Producer
2014	TV series	Mozart in the Jungle	Producer
2015	TV series	Mozart in the Jungle, season 2	Co-Executive Producer
2016	TV series	Mozart in the Jungle, season 3	Executive producer
2016	TV series	Wormwood	Executive producer
2017	TV series	Mozart in the Jungle, season 4	Executive producer
2018	Film	Bel Canto (film)	Producer
2019	TV series	Katy Keene, Pilot	Producer
2020	TV series	Katy Keene, season 1	Producer
2021	TV series	Lisey's Story (miniseries)	Co-Executive Producer
2022	TV series	Pretty Little Liars: Original Sin	Executive Producer
2025	TV series	Severance, season 2	Executive Producer
2026	TV series	The Beast in Me	Executive Producer

== Awards and nominations ==
Year	Award	Category	Film	Result
2002	BAFTA Film Award	Best Film Not in the English Language Shared with Mira Nair	Monsoon Wedding	Nominated
2006	Academy Awards	Best Picture Shared with William Vince and Michael Ohoven	Capote	Nominated
2006	BAFTA Film Award	Best Film Shared with William Vince and Michael Ohoven	Capote	Nominated
2006	Independent Spirit Awards	Producers Award	Capote (2005) and Monsoon Wedding (2001)	Won
2006	Independent Spirit Awards	Best Film Shared with William Vince and Michael Ohoven	Capote	Nominated
2006	Leo Awards	Best Feature Length Drama Shared with William Vince and Michael Ohoven	Capote	Won
2006	PGA Awards	PGA Award Shared with William Vince and Michael Ohoven	Capote	Nominated
2015	Golden Globe Award	Best Comedy Series Shared with Paul Weitz, Roman Coppola and Jason Schwartzman	Mozart in the Jungle	Won
2025	Emmy Awards	Outstanding Drama Series	Severance	Nominated
2026	Golden Globe Award	Best Television Series – Drama	Severance	Nominated
2026	Golden Globe Award	Best Limited Series	The Beast in Me	Nominated
