= Francophonia =

Francophonia may refer to:

- Francophonie, the term meaning use of the French language
- Francofonia, a 2015 film
