= Takemitsu Zamurai =

Japanese manga series by Taiyō Matsumoto

- First volume cover

竹光侍
- Genre: Historical
- Manga
- Written by: Issei Eifuku
- Illustrated by: Taiyō Matsumoto
- Published by: Shogakukan
- English publisher: NA: Viz Media
- Magazine: Weekly Big Comic Spirits
- Original run: August 7, 2006 – March 15, 2010
- Volumes: 8
- icon

Takemitsu Zamurai (竹光侍; lit. 'Bamboo Sword Samurai') is a Japanese manga series written by Issei Eifuku and illustrated by Taiyō Matsumoto. It was published in Shogakukan's seinen manga magazine Weekly Big Comic Spirits from August 2006 to March 2010, with its chapters collected in eight wideban volumes. The manga has been licensed for English release by Viz Media.

== Plot ==
The rōnin Senō Sōichirō arrives in a tenement neighborhood in Edo at the beginning of a new year. His presence unsettles the residents and rumors circulate about his past. He sells his katana and begins using a bamboo sword, eventually taking work as a teacher. Over time, he becomes integrated into the community and develops a close relationship with a local boy named Kankichi. Despite his calm demeanor, Sōichirō harbors a violent past in Shinano and a strong fascination with sword fighting, which gradually becomes more apparent.

Violent incidents begin to occur in the neighborhood, including the murder of several sex workers. When a spate of murders, including the deaths of prostitutes, disturbs the neighborhood, Sōichirō is forced into violent confrontations. He becomes the target of the assassin Kikuchi Shinnosuke, who seems driven by bloodlust but also displays unexpected tenderness toward animals. Sōichirō rises to defend himself and his community. After defeating Kikuchi and facing internal and external demons, he attains a fragile peace and quietly departs the tenement, leaving behind the life he briefly built.

== Production ==
=== Development and concept ===
Following mixed responses to some of his earlier works for Morning magazine, Taiyō Matsumoto sought to pursue a project that diverged from his previous contemporary and fantastical stories. His editor, Hori, subsequently invited him to contribute a new series to Weekly Big Comic Spirits.

Takemitsu Zamurai marked a deliberate shift toward historical realism and emotional subtlety, influenced by Matsumoto's research into Edo-period culture, including ukiyo-e art and contemporary literature. He conducted preparatory visits to institutions like the Edo-Tokyo Museum and studied artifacts such as the Kidai shōran scroll, which provided immersive visual reference for everyday life in Edo. Although not generally an enthusiast of samurai cinema, Matsumoto admired certain films, such as Sharaku (1995), for their atmospheric depiction of the era.

Unlike his prior works, Matsumoto collaborated closely with writer Issei Eifuku, who developed the narrative, enabling Matsumoto to concentrate on the artwork. This partnership proved instrumental in expanding Matsumoto's creative range, particularly in depicting characters with darker and more morally ambiguous traits. He noted that Eifuku's scripts challenged him to illustrate "ugliness" in a manner he had not previously attempted, which revitalized his narrative engagement. Matsumoto intended to portray the protagonist not as a conventional hero, but as a psychologically complex individual shaped by adversity.

Reflecting on this period, Matsumoto described a weariness with his own earlier storytelling methods and expressed renewed motivation through collaboration and historical subject matter. He indicated a continued interest in narratives drawn from personal experience and history, framing Takemitsu Zamurai as a significant evolution in his artistic trajectory.

=== Visual approach ===
Matsumoto adopted a distinctive artistic method for the series, utilizing brush ink on rough-textured paper to evoke the gritty atmosphere of the Edo period. He deliberately avoided screentones, favoring traditional inking techniques to enhance texture and mood. Authentic lighting conditions—such as candlelight and paper lanterns—were carefully rendered based on historical research to achieve realism, particularly in night scenes.

He worked with a small team of assistants, including his wife, manga artist Saho Tōno, and Issei Eifuku, valuing their close understanding and the resulting consistency and efficiency in production. Although adept at drawing male characters, Matsumoto noted a persistent challenge in depicting female figures, often relying on Eifuku's inclusion of them to push his artistic boundaries. He observed that his difficulty stemmed from overemphasizing gendered features rather than approaching them as individuals.

== Analysis ==
Takemitsu Zamurai departs from traditional samurai genre conventions, particularly in its subdued approach to violence. The protagonist, Senō Sōichirō, is a skilled swordsman who rarely kills, reflecting creators Matsumoto and Eifuku's deliberate avoidance of glorifying death, a common trope in samurai fiction. Matsumoto stated that this choice was meant to emphasize the weight of killing rather than normalize it through repetitive, stylized combat. He also noted that the narrative often shifts focus away from direct battles, instead examining character psychology and survival within a declining social order.

== Publication ==
Written by Issei Eifuku and illustrated by Taiyō Matsumoto, Takemitsu Zamurai was serialized in Shogakukan's seinen manga magazine Weekly Big Comic Spirits from August 7, 2006, to March 15, 2010. Shogakukan collected its chapters in eight wideban volumes, released from December 15, 2006, to April 28, 2010.

In June 2026, Viz Media that it had licensed the manga for English release in North America, with the first volume set to release in Q2 2027.

=== Volumes ===
No.	Japanese release date	Japanese ISBN
1	December 15, 2006	978-4-09-181034-2
2	May 30, 2007	978-4-09-181320-6
3	October 30, 2007	978-4-09-181588-0
4	March 28, 2008	978-4-09-181848-5
5	September 30, 2008	978-4-09-182190-4
6	April 30, 2009	978-4-09-182476-9
7	October 30, 2009	978-4-09-182736-4
8	April 28, 2010	978-4-09-183119-4

== Reception ==
Takemitsu Zamurai won the Excellence Prize in the Manga Division at the 11th Japan Media Arts Festival Awards in 2007. It also won the Grand Prize at the 15th Tezuka Osamu Cultural Prize in 2011. It was nominated for Best Comic at the 2012 Angoulême International Comics Festival.

Manga critic Natsume Fusanosuke calls the series a "fascinating work" and understands it less as a manga and more as an example of jidaimono, a genre of classic popular novels with historical themes.

== See also ==
- Shōwa Tennō Monogatari, another manga series written by Issei Eifuku
