= Nba! =

Japanese manga series

- First tankōbon volume cover

んば！
- Genre: Mystery, thriller
- Manga
- Written by: Uo Ayae
- Published by: Shogakukan
- Imprint: Big Comics
- Magazine: Big Comic Original
- Original run: May 2, 2024 – present
- Volumes: 5

Nba! (んば！) is a Japanese manga series written and illustrated by Uo Ayae. It began serialization in Shogakukan's seinen manga magazine Big Comic Original in May 2024.

== Synopsis ==
Momota is a 24-year-old man who lives his life by doing what he believes is the right thing according to what the law, his company's rules or his common sense say. One day, he is asked by his boss to guard a ranch of pigs from pests, he later meets a mysterious girl on the job, and his life begins to drastically change.

== Publication ==
Written and illustrated by Uo Ayae, Nba! began serialization in Shogakukan's seinen manga magazine Big Comic Original on May 2, 2024. Its chapters have been collected in five tankōbon volumes as of September 2026.

No.	Release date	ISBN
1	April 30, 2025	978-4-09-863189-6
2	August 29, 2025	978-4-09-863543-6
3	December 26, 2025	978-4-09-863668-6
4	April 30, 2026	978-4-09-863889-5
5	September 30, 2026	978-4-09-864086-7

== Reception ==
The series has been recommended by television producer Nobuyuki Sakuma and comedian Gunpi.

The series was ranked fifteenth in Da Vinci's 2025 Book of the Year ranking. The series, alongside RIOT, was ranked fourteenth in the 2026 edition of Takarajimasha's Kono Manga ga Sugoi! guidebook's list of best manga for male readers.
