= Saho Tōno =

Japanese manga artist

Saho Tōno (Japanese: 冬野 さほ, Hepburn: Tōno Saho; born 1970) is a Japanese manga artist.

== Biography ==
Saho Tōno was born in 1970 in Japan's Nagano Prefecture. She is known for her work as a manga artist and an illustrator.

Tōno began her career writing shōjo manga. Her debut story, "Pure Christmas," appeared in the magazine Margaret in 1988. However, she eventually shifted into a more experimental style. Her work frequently focuses on young children as protagonists.

Tōno's best-known books include You in the Pocket (1993), Twinkle (1997), and Midnight (2003).

She is married to fellow manga artist Taiyō Matsumoto, and she frequently contributes to his projects, such as Sunny and Tokyo These Days, as a colorist and advisor.
