= Evacuation of the Louvre collection during World War II =

The Winged Victory of Samothrace was carefully lowered down a ramp

During the beginning of the German invasions during World War II, Jacques Jaujard, the director of the French Musées Nationaux, anticipating the fall of France, organized the evacuation of the Louvre art collection to the provinces.

== Evacuation of the art collection ==
The Grande Gallerie in September 1939

On 25 August 1939, the Louvre was closed for three days, officially for repairs. However, much of the Louvre art collection was hauled on trucks (203 vehicles transporting 1862 wooden cases) and sent to Château de Chambord. The crates had a marking to identify the importance of the art pieces they contained: a yellow circle for very valuable art pieces, green for major works and red for world treasures (the Mona Lisa was marked with three red circles).

Some of the art pieces were too big to be fit in a truck. For example The Raft of the Medusa had to be covered with a blanket. When the truck initially arrived at Versailles on its route to Chambord, the canvas touched an electric cable and created a short-circuit which switched off the electricity in the whole town. After that, the routes were carefully planned to avoid this type of problem, and attendants with poles were responsible for dealing with electric or phone cables.

The last art piece to leave the museum was the Winged Victory of Samothrace, which was moved on September 3, 1939, the day the French ultimatum to Germany expired.

Throughout the war, the art pieces were clandestinely moved from château to château to avoid being taken back by the Nazis. For example, the Mona Lisa was moved from Chambord to several castles and abbeys, to finish at the end of the war at the Musée Ingres in Montauban. The Winged Victory of Samothrace and Venus de Milo were kept at Château de Valençay, which was spared the German occupation on a technicality.

== The arrival of the German army in Paris ==
On 16 August 1940, count Franz von Wolff-Metternich, who was responsible of the conservation of the French art collections under the Kunstschutz principle, arrived in Paris to oversee France's art collection, but the museum was almost empty. He knew what was going on but voluntarily did not do anything.

== See also ==
- Nazi plunder
- Paris in World War II

== Bibliography ==
- Nicholas, Lynn H. (1995). The Rape of Europa : The Fate of Europe's Treasures in the Third Reich and the Second World War. Knopf Doubleday Publishing Group.
- Jean-Pierre Devillers (2014). Illustre et Inconnu. Comment Jacques Jaujard a sauvé le Louvre (Television production). Ladybirds Films.
