= GoGo Monster =

Japanese manga series

- Volume cover

GOGOモンスター (Gōgō Monsutā)
- Genre: Horror; Mystery; Supernatural
- Manga
- Written by: Taiyō Matsumoto
- Published by: Shogakukan
- English publisher: NA: Viz Media
- Published: October 23, 2000
- Volumes: 1

GoGo Monster (Japanese: GOGOモンスター, Hepburn: Gōgō Monsutā) is a Japanese manga written and illustrated by Taiyō Matsumoto.

== Plot ==
In an elementary school, more and more unfortunate events accumulate. The third grader Yuki claims to have a connection with and visions about a parallel world and he claims that the unfortunate series of events are connected to this parallel world. Creatures form another world would live on the last floor of school. The fifth grader IQ, who is a prodigy in mathematics and wears a cardboard box over his head at all times, sees Yuki as a mentally ill and lonely person, but hangs out with him. Both IQ and Yuki are mostly excluded in their classes. Yuki's classmate Makoto is friends with him.

== Publication ==
A seinen manga, GoGo Monster was published by Shogakukan in a single tankōbon volume on October 23, 2000.

The release of an English-language version of GoGo Monster was announced by Viz Media in February 2009, releasing it on November 17 of that same year. In October 2023, Viz Media announced the reprint the manga, which was released on July 23, 2024.

The manga was also translated into Spanish, French, and German.

== Reception ==
GoGo Monster won the Special Award at the 30th Japan Cartoonists Association Award in 2001. In 2006, the manga earned a nomination for Angoulême International Comics Festival Prize for Artwork, which it lost to Le vol du corbeau by Jean-Pierre Gibrat. It was nominated to the 2009 Los Angeles Times Book Prize for Best Graphic Novel but David Mazzucchelli's Asterios Polyp won it.

The manga was generally received positively by critics, including Deb Aoki of About.com, Joseph Luster of Otaku USA, Oliver Ho of PopMatters, Publishers Weekly, and Shaenon K. Garrity. Erin Finnegan of Anime News Network called it "one of the best manga of 2009." The Comics Reporter's staff elected it the 9th best comic of the year.
