= Kaze no Daichi =

Japanese manga series

- First tankōbon volume cover

風の大地
- Genre: Sports
- Manga
- Written by: Nobuhiro Sakata
- Illustrated by: Eiji Kazama
- Published by: Shogakukan
- Magazine: Big Comic Original
- Original run: 1990 – 2022
- Volumes: 84
- icon

Kaze no Daichi (風の大地; lit. 'Land of the Wind') is a Japanese golf-themed manga series written by Nobuhiro Sakata and illustrated by Eiji Kazama. It was serialized in Shogakukan's seinen manga magazine Big Comic Original from 1990 to 2022, with its chapters collected in 84 tankōbon volumes. The series was put on indefinite hiatus in 2022, later being discontinued following the deaths of Sakata in that same year and Kazama in 2024.

In 1994, the manga won the 39th Shogakukan Manga Award in the general category.

== Plot ==
The series focuses on Keisuke Okita, who takes up golf at the age of 24 and through talent, hard work, and good coaching quickly turns pro. After a good performance in Asian professional golf tours, he enters the British Open, where he falls in love with his caddy, Lily. He later participates other major golf tournaments, including the Masters Tournament.

== Characters ==
Keisuke Okita (沖田圭介, Okita Keisuke)
Keisuke had to leave university because of family problems, and joined Kanuma country club as a trainee.
Masayuki Ugajin (宇賀神正行, Ugajin Masayuki)
Takashi kasazaki (笠崎孝, Kasazaki Takashi)

== Publication ==
Written by Nobuhiro Sakata and illustrated by Eiji Kazama, Kaze no Daichi started in Shogakukan's seinen manga magazine Big Comic Original in 1990. Its last chapter was published on May 20, 2022, and the series was put on indefinite hiatus; Kazama died of pancreatic cancer at 75 on October 2 of that same year, and the last chapter he made was posthumously published in Big Comic Original on December 5. Sakata died at 76 on July 22, 2024, leaving the manga unfinished. Shogakukan collected the series's chapters into individual tankōbon volumes. The first volume was released on March 30, 1991. The 84th and last volume was released on August 30, 2022.

== Reception ==
In 1994, Kaze no Daichi won the 39th Shogakukan Manga Award in the general category. In 2021, the series ranked 88th on TV Asahi's "Manga General Election" poll in which 150,000 people voted for their "Most Favorite Manga".
