= Shōwa Tennō Monogatari =

Japanese manga series

- First volume cover

昭和天皇物語
- Genre: Historical
- Created by: Kazutoshi Handō
- Manga
- Written by: Issei Eifuku
- Illustrated by: Junichi Nōjō
- Published by: Shogakukan
- Magazine: Big Comic Original
- Original run: April 20, 2017 – present
- Volumes: 19
- icon

Shōwa Tennō Monogatari (昭和天皇物語; lit. 'Shōwa Emperor Tale') is a Japanese manga series written series written by Issei Eifuku and illustrated by Junichi Nōjō, based on the multi-volume history Shōwashi by Kazutoshi Handō. It has been serialized in Shogakukan's seinen manga magazine Big Comic Original since April 2017.

== Plot ==
The series explores the life and reign of Emperor Shōwa (Hirohito) across twentieth-century Japan. Apart from a prologue set at Douglas MacArthur's postwar occupation in 1945, it proceeds chronologically from 1904, dramatizing in detail:

- The young Hirohito's childhood, upbringing, and education at the Gakushūin
- His ascension to Crown Prince, and subsequent tour of Europe
- The chaotic aftermath of the 1923 earthquake, intertwined with massacres and assassination attempts
- His marriage to Princess Nagako, and ascension as Emperor Shōwa
- Japan's rapidly-militarizing government, leading to its eventual invasion of Manchuria and coup attempt
- The full outbreak of World War II, bringing unprecedented violence from—and to—the Japanese Empire

== Production ==
Editor-in-chief of Big Comic Original Nakaguma Ichirō first thought of the idea of a manga about the Imperial Family after watching the 2006 film The Queen. He noted that manga artists have not worked on this theme before, as in Japan it is generally considered taboo to speak about the imperial family in such a familiar fashion. As Japan suffered greatly during World War II, he wanted to depict the Emperor's feelings and personal situation at the time, and also felt that Japanese readers would also like to know about him.

== Publication ==
Written by Issei Eifuku and illustrated by Junichi Nōjō, based on the novel Shōwashi by Kazutoshi Handō, Shōwa Tennō Monogatari started in Shogakukan's seinen manga magazine Big Comic Original on April 20, 2017. Shogakukan has collected its chapters into individual tankōbon volumes. The first volume was released on October 30, 2017. As of August 28, 2026, 19 volumes have been released.

=== Volumes ===
No.	Japanese release date	Japanese ISBN
1	October 30, 2017	978-4-09-189717-6
2	March 30, 2018	978-4-09-189825-8
3	November 30, 2018	978-4-09-860177-6
4	June 28, 2019	978-4-09-860497-5
5	November 29, 2019	978-4-09-860497-5
6	April 27, 2020	978-4-09-860605-4
7	November 30, 2020	978-4-09-860777-8
8	May 28, 2021	978-4-09-861057-0
9	October 29, 2021	978-4-09-861174-4
10	May 30, 2022	978-4-09-861350-2
11	October 28, 2022	978-4-09-861458-5
12	March 30, 2023	978-4-09-861609-1
13	August 30, 2023	978-4-09-862559-8
14	January 30, 2024	978-4-09-862687-8
15	July 30, 2024	978-4-09-863012-7
16	January 30, 2025	978-4-09-863185-8
17	July 30, 2025	978-4-09-863524-5
18	March 30, 2026	978-4-09-863795-9
19	August 28, 2026	978-4-09-864077-5

== Reception ==
By 2019, the series has sold over 140,000 copies. Shōwa Tennō Monogatari ranked sixth on Takarajimasha's Kono Manga ga Sugoi! 2019 ranking of Top 20 manga for male readers. The series was nominated for the 43rd Kodansha Manga Award for the Best General Manga category in 2019. The series was nominated for the 68th Shogakukan Manga Award in the general category in 2022.

== See also ==
- Takemitsuzamurai, another manga series written by Issei Eifuku
