= Hanaotoko =

Japanese manga series

- First tankōbon volume cover

花男
- Genre: Slice of life; Sports
- Manga
- Written by: Taiyō Matsumoto
- Published by: Shogakukan
- Magazine: Weekly Big Comic Spirits
- Original run: 1991 – 1992
- Volumes: 3
- icon

Hanaotoko (花男) is a Japanese manga series written and illustrated by Taiyō Matsumoto. It was serialized in Shogakukan's seinen manga magazine Weekly Big Comic Spirits from 1991 to 1992.

== Plot ==
Shigeo Hanada is a diligent and studious high school student who lives alone with his mother. As summer vacation begins, he is forced to move in with his estranged father, Hanao, a man in his thirties who abandoned the family years earlier to pursue his dream of becoming a professional baseball player for the Tokyo Giants. The two are polar opposites: Hanao remains a carefree dreamer with a childlike outlook on life, while Shigeo is pragmatic and solely focused on academic success. Initially resistant to his father's unconventional lifestyle, Shigeo gradually begins to realize that life's most important lessons extend beyond the classroom. Through their strained yet evolving relationship, he discovers new perspectives on ambition, family, and personal growth.

== Publication ==
Written and illustrated by Taiyō Matsumoto, Hanaotoko was serialized in Shogakukan's seinen manga magazine Weekly Big Comic Spirits from 1991 to 1992. Shogakukan collected its chapters in three tankōbon volumes, released from March 30 to August 29, 1992. Shogakukan re-released the series in three wideban on October 30, 1998. The series was re-released in a three-in-one volume on July 30, 2018.
