= Bel Canto (film) =

- Theatrical release poster
- Directed by: Paul Weitz
- Screenplay by: Paul Weitz; Anthony Weintraub
- Based on: Bel Canto by Ann Patchett
- Produced by: Caroline Baron; Anthony Weintraub; Paul Weitz; Andrew Miano
- Starring: Julianne Moore; Ken Watanabe; Sebastian Koch; Christopher Lambert
- Cinematography: Tobias Datum
- Edited by: Suzy Elmiger
- Music by: David Majzlin
- Production companies: A-Line Pictures; Depth of Field; Bloom; Priority Pictures
- Distributed by: Screen Media Films
- Release date: September 14, 2018 (United States)
- Running time: 102 minutes
- Country: United States
- Language: English
- Box office: $350,264

Bel Canto is a 2018 American drama film directed by Paul Weitz, from a screenplay by Weitz and Anthony Weintraub. It is based on the 2001 novel of the same name by Ann Patchett. It stars Julianne Moore, Ken Watanabe, Sebastian Koch, and Christopher Lambert.

It was released on September 14, 2018 by Screen Media Films.

== Synopsis ==
Roxane Coss, a famous American soprano, travels to South America to give a private concert at the birthday party of rich Japanese industrialist Katsumi Hosokawa. Just as a handsome gathering of local dignitaries convenes at Vice-President Ruben Ochoa's mansion, including French Ambassador Thibault and his wife, Hosokawa's faithful translator Gen, and Russian trade delegate Fyodorov, the house is taken over by guerrillas led by Comandante Benjamin demanding the release of their imprisoned comrades. Their only contact with the outside world is through Red Cross negotiator Messner. A month-long standoff ensues in which hostages and captors must overcome their differences and find their shared humanity and hope in the face of impending disaster.

== Cast and characters ==
- Julianne Moore as Roxane Coss (Renée Fleming as her singing "voice")
- Ken Watanabe as Katsumi Hosokawa
- Sebastian Koch as Joachim Messner
- Christopher Lambert as Simon Thibault
- Ryo Kase as Gen Watanabe
- Tenoch Huerta as Comandante Benjamin
- María Mercedes Coroy as Carmen
- Olek Krupa as Fyodorov
- Melissa Navia as Esmeralda
- Gabo Augustine as Ismael
- Elsa Zylberstein as Edith Thibault
- J. Eddie Martinez as Vice-President Ruben Ochoa
- Bobby Daniel Rodriguez as Father Arguedas
- Nico Bustamante as Ruben's son Marco
- Jay Santiago as Monsignor Rolland

== Production ==
In August 2016, it was announced that Julianne Moore, Ken Watanabe and Demián Bichir joined the cast of the film, with Paul Weitz directing, from a screenplay he wrote alongside Anthony Weintraub, based upon the novel of the same name. Caroline Baron, Weintraub, Weitz and Andrew Miano will serve as producers on the film, under their A-Line Pictures and Depth of Field banners, respectively. In February 2017, Sebastian Koch, Christopher Lambert, Elsa Zylberstein joined the cast of the film. Renée Fleming joined the films as Moore's singing voice. It was later revealed María Mercedes Coroy joined the cast of the film.

Principal photography began in New York on February 13, 2017.

== Release ==
In May 2018, Screen Media Films acquired U.S. distribution rights to the film. It was released on September 14, 2018. As of October 2021, 46% of the 74 critical reviews compiled on Rotten Tomatoes are positive, with an average rating of 5.4/10. The website's critics consensus reads: "Bel Canto's reach occasionally exceeds its ambitious grasp in terms of juggling themes and tones, but it's held together by palpable emotion and a pair of strong leads."

== See also ==
- Japanese embassy hostage crisis
