= Anthony Weintraub =

American screenwriter

Anthony Weintraub is an American screenwriter, producer, director, and educator.

== Career ==
Weintraub wrote the screenplay for the animated feature film Tekkonkinkreet (2006), directed by Michael Arias and produced by Studio 4°C. The film, based on Taiyo Matsumoto's manga Black & White, won the Japan Academy Prize for Animation of the Year.

He co-wrote and produced Bel Canto (2018), directed by Paul Weitz and based on the novel by Ann Patchett, starring Julianne Moore and Ken Watanabe. The film premiered at the Toronto International Film Festival.

Weintraub has also worked in theater and interdisciplinary art, serving as dramaturg on Life After BOB, a project by artist Ian Cheng presented at The Shed in New York.

== Teaching ==
Weintraub is an adjunct professor at New York University's Tisch School of the Arts, where he teaches screenwriting.
