= Cats of the Louvre =

Japanese manga series

- Cover of the first volume

ルーヴルの猫 (Rūvuru no Neko)
- Genre: Fantasy, mystery
- Manga
- Written by: Taiyō Matsumoto
- Published by: Shogakukan
- English publisher: NA: Viz Media
- Magazine: Big Comic Original
- Original run: June 20, 2016 – July 20, 2017
- Volumes: 2
- icon

Cats of the Louvre (Japanese: ルーヴルの猫, Hepburn: Rūvuru no Neko) is a Japanese manga series written and illustrated by Taiyō Matsumoto. It was serialized in Shogakukan's Big Comic Original magazine from June 2016 to July 2017.

== Plot ==
A group of cats lives hidden in the attic of the Louvre, avoiding human detection. Among them is a curious kitten named Yukinoko (ゆきのこ), who begins wandering the museum alone. Yukinoko possesses a mysterious ability to enter the world within paintings, uncovering the surreal and secret depths of the Louvre's art.

== Publication ==
Written and illustrated by Taiyō Matsumoto, Cats of the Louvre was serialized in Shogakukan's seinen manga magazine Big Comic Original from June 20, 2016, to July 20, 2017. Shogakukan published its individual chapters into two wideban volumes, released on October 30, 2017.

In North America, the manga has been licensed by Viz Media. It was released in a single volume on September 17, 2019.

== Reception ==
Along with Kamome Shirahama's Witch Hat Atelier, the series won the 2020 Eisner Award for Best U.S. Edition of International Material in the Asia category for Viz Media's English release.

Rebecca Silverman of Anime News Network awarded the series 4 out of 5 stars, praising it as both a narrative and a work of art criticism. She highlighted Matsumoto's art style for enhancing its magic realism and suggested its potential use in art appreciation courses. Faye Hopper, also writing for the same site, rated it 4½ stars, calling it a "beautiful, moving, and artistically rich story about escapism". Hopper compared its depth to the paintings at the Louvre, stating that it merited thoughtful engagement from art enthusiasts. Theron Martin graded it a B+, acknowledging its unconventional approach while noting that certain stylistic choices did not fully resonate with him. He emphasized that appreciation for classical art or cats was not a prerequisite for enjoying the work.
