= Akagari: The Red Rat in Hollywood =

Japanese manga series

- First tankōbon volume cover, featuring (from top to bottom) Arnold Kibby, William Wyler, Dalton Trumbo, and Helen Wyman

赤狩り THE RED RAT IN HOLLYWOOD
- Genre: Historical
- Manga
- Written by: Osamu Yamamoto
- Published by: Shogakukan
- Magazine: Big Comic Original
- Original run: May 20, 2017 – April 5, 2021
- Volumes: 10
- icon

Akagari: The Red Rat in Hollywood (赤狩り THE RED RAT IN HOLLYWOOD) is a Japanese manga series written and illustrated by Osamu Yamamoto. It was serialized in Shogakukan's seinen manga magazine Big Comic Original from May 2017 to April 2021, with its chapters collected in ten tankōbon volumes.

== Synopsis ==
The series is a fictionalized account of the Second Red Scare and Hollywood blacklist in the United States during the 1940s and 1950s, touching on the productions of many films of the time (including Roman Holiday, On the Waterfront, and East of Eden), with particular focus on the activities of Elia Kazan and Dalton Trumbo.

== Publication ==
Written and illustrated by Osamu Yamamoto, Akagari: The Red Rat in Hollywood was serialized in Shogakukan's seinen manga magazine Big Comic Original from May 20, 2017, to April 5, 2021. Shogakukan collected its chapters in ten tankōbon volumes, released from November 30, 2017, to June 30, 2021.

=== Volumes ===
No.	Japanese release date	Japanese ISBN
1	November 30, 2017	978-4-09-189687-2
2	April 27, 2018	978-4-09-189870-8
3	September 28, 2018	978-4-09-860085-4
4	February 28, 2019	978-4-09-860234-6
5	May 30, 2019	978-4-09-860291-9
6	October 30, 2019	978-4-09-860453-1
7	March 30, 2020	978-4-09-860571-2
8	September 30, 2020	978-4-09-860723-5
9	April 30, 2021	978-4-09-861035-8
10	June 30, 2021	978-4-09-861069-3

== Reception ==
Akagari: The Red Rat in Hollywood was one of the Jury Recommended Works at the 23rd Japan Media Arts Festival in 2020.
