= Taiyō Matsumoto =

Japanese manga artist

Taiyō Matsumoto 松本 大洋
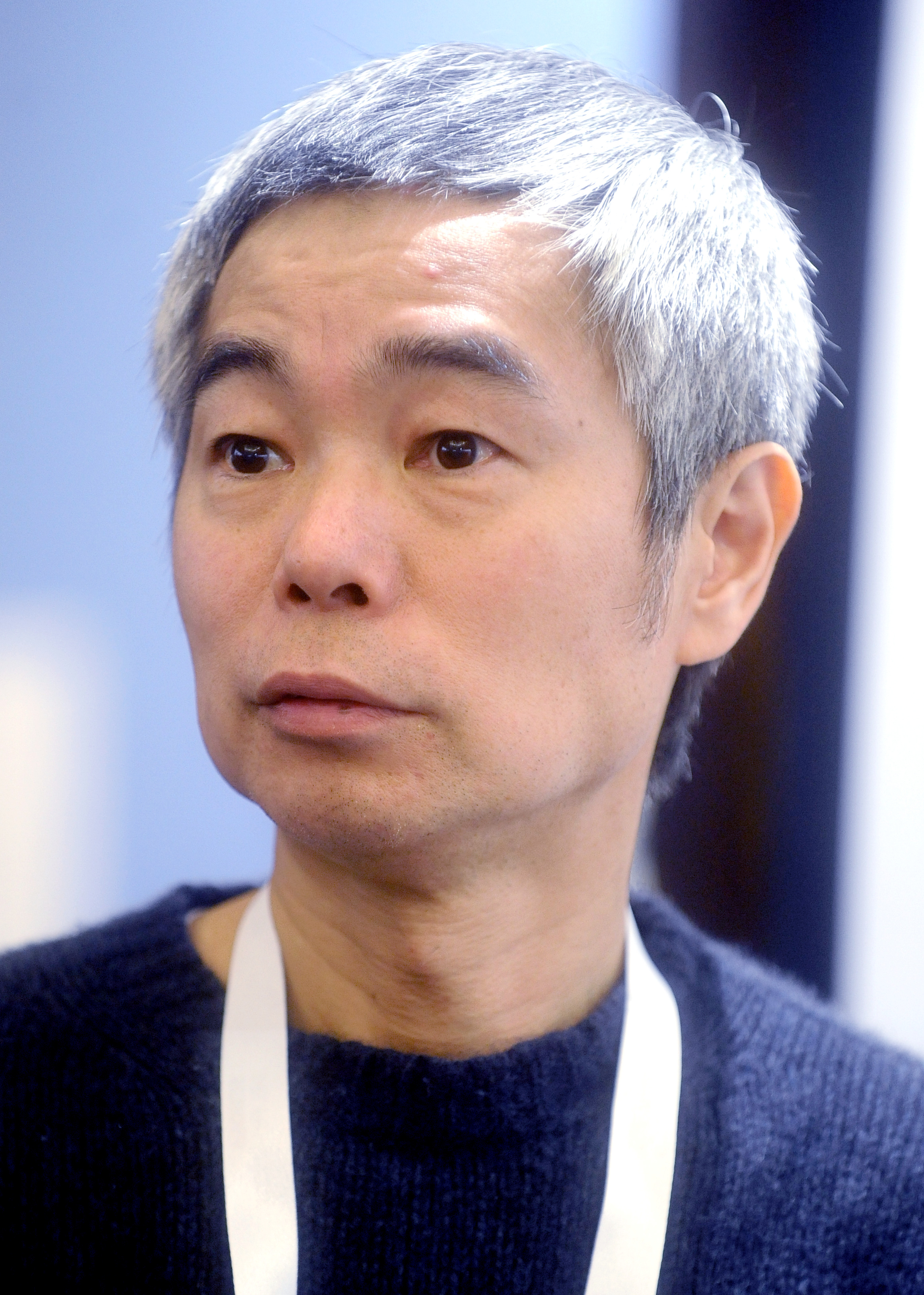
- Matsumoto in 2017
- Born: October 25, 1967 (age 59)
- Area: Manga artist
- Notable works: Tekkonkinkreet; Takemitsu Zamurai; Ping Pong; Sunny
- Awards: Japan Cartoonists Association Award, 2001 for GoGo Monster; Japan Media Arts Festival, 2007 for Takemitsu Zamurai; Eisner Awards, 2008 for Tekkonkinkreet; Tezuka Osamu Cultural Prize, 2011 for Takemitsu Zamurai with Issei Eifuku; Cartoonist Studio Prize, 2014 for Sunny; Japan Media Arts Festival, 2016 for Sunny; Shogakukan Manga Award, 2016 for Sunny; Eisner Awards, 2020 for Cats of the Louvre

Taiyō Matsumoto (Japanese: 松本 大洋, Hepburn: Matsumoto Taiyō; born October 25, 1967) is a Japanese manga artist. Active as a professional manga artist since the 1980s, he is known for his experimental style and genre-blending works such as Tekkonkinkreet, Ping Pong, and No. 5. Influenced by Katsuhiro Otomo and French bande dessinée, his art combines psychological depth with rough, expressive lines. Matsumoto has won multiple awards, including the Eisner Award and Tezuka Osamu Cultural Prize.

== Career ==
Matsumoto was born in Tokyo. Originally, he wanted to become a soccer player. but changed to artist as an occupation instead after reading Katsuhiro Otomo's Domu: A Child's Dream. While studying literature at Wako University, he started drawing manga. He was an admirer of the manga artist Seiki Tsuchida and sent his work to the newcomer contest Comic Open of Kodansha's magazine Morning that Tsuchida was working for. After his initial success in the Comic Open contest, he did a self-financed tour of France in 1986, visiting the Paris-Dakar Rally, an event that became a significant point in his career.

Matsumoto published his first manga in 1987 at the age of 20 in Morning with Straight. While he published a few works there, he didn't gain enough popularity and was eventually not able to publish anymore in big magazines like Morning. Instead, he came in contact with Yasuki Hori, editor at Shogakukan, who pushed him to draw a manga about boxing, which became Zero and was published in the magazine Big Comic Spirits between 1990 and 1991.

In 1993, he began work on the Tekkonkinkreet manga, which became a success in the Big Spirits magazine, and published a series of short stories in a collection called Nihon no Kyodai that was publicized at the time by Comic Aré magazine. Ping Pong appeared in Big Spirits in 1996, soon followed by the series No. 5 in Shogakukan's Monthly Ikki magazine in 2000.

The Tekkonkinkreet anime was released in Japan in late 2006, and both the anime and manga have been published in English.

== Style ==
=== Themes ===
The manga he produced covers a variety of topics, from sports manga to family comedies to science fiction epics. Manga critic Natsume Fusanosuke divided his manga series in 2021 into different distinct categories: Manga like Zero, Hanaotoko and Ping Pong that work within the artistic framework of shōnen manga and seinen manga and that were developed with the pressure of editors in mind that wanted him to fit into the industry's standards. However, dystopian science-fiction manga like Tekkonkinkreet and No. 5 as well as the autobiographical orphanage story Sunny in a lot of ways break with many conventions of the manga industry's norms. Fusanosuke analyzes that these manga follow a path that has been developed after the success of Katsuhiro Otomo and are influenced by French bande dessinée.

His worldbuilding often, for example in No 5 and Takemitsu Zamurai, includes with emotionally expressive animals— who observe the action with equal narrative weight as the human characters. This constant decentering, according to Sean McTiernan, introduces a kind of "planet-building," shifting focus from protagonist drama to ambient life, undermining the usual ego-centric logic of genre fiction.

His work is seen as "meta manga", often criticizing the genres within which they operate. The manga Takemitsu Zamurai breaks with traditions of historical samurai stories by highlighting inner psychology of characters and avoiding normalized depictions of violence.

=== Visual style ===
Matsumoto draws free-hand, with sketchy wavering lines. His lines are, according to Natsume Fusanosuke, often messy, aggressive, and "ugly", conveying not beauty but psychological friction and intensity. This aligns with what Fusanosuke terms arasa (荒さ, roughness) and bōryokusei (暴力性, violence), key terms in Japanese art criticism that point to Matsumoto's deliberate embrace of disorder and raw emotion.

Matsumoto uses skewed angles, contorted facial expressions, and cramped compositions to evoke sensations that go beyond narrative clarity. As Fusanosuke writes, "his drawings may be hard to read, but they leave an impact." Panels often appear unfinished or asymmetrical, with frequent use of extreme close-ups and fisheye perspectives, heightening the reader's sense of disorientation or immersion. Especially in works like Ping Pong, these techniques reflect the inner states of characters more than external realism, what Natsume calls a "psychological realism" through form. The panel composition in Ping Pong is used to evoke the feeling of speed.

=== Influences ===
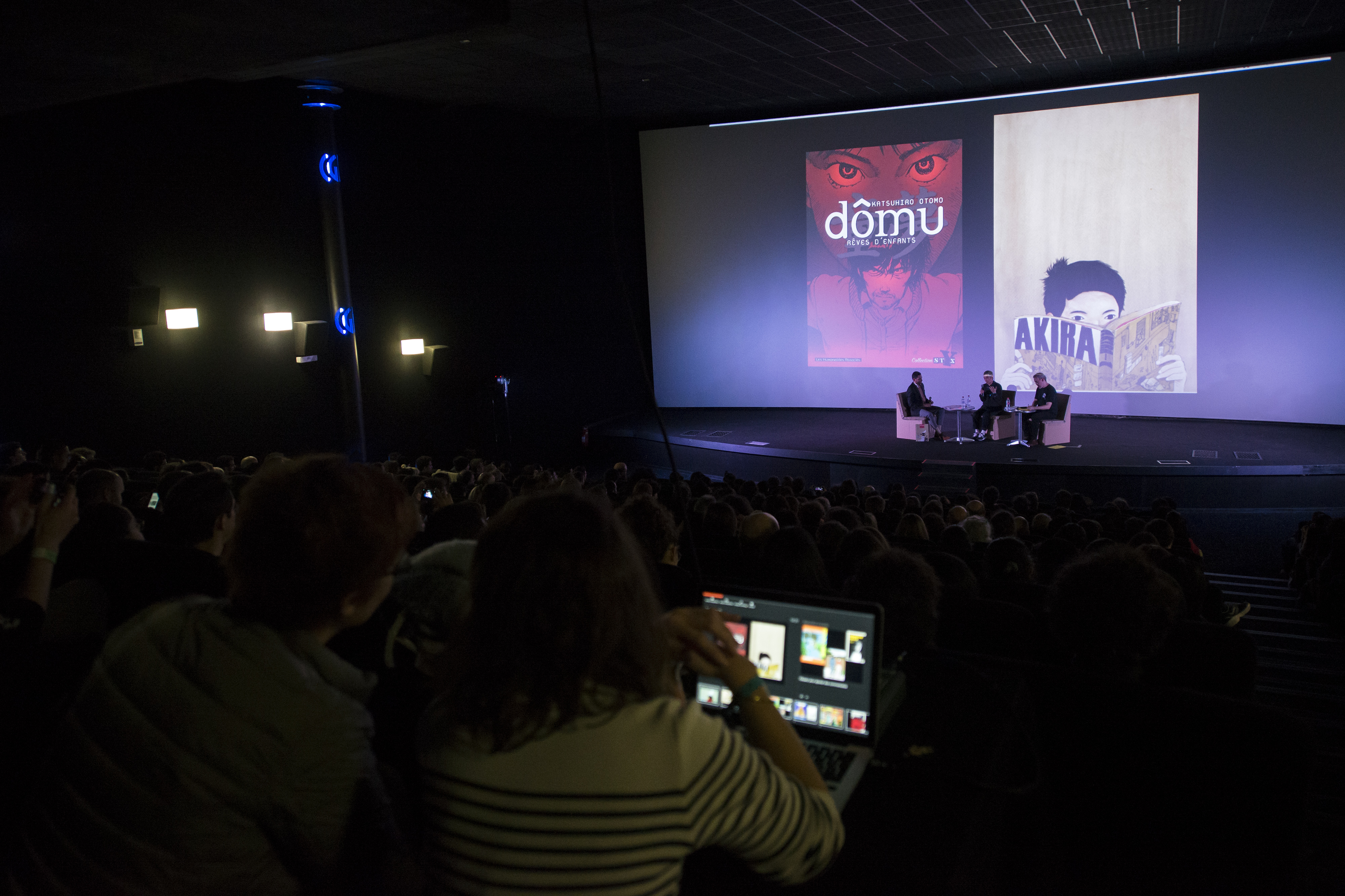
Matsumoto giving a masterclass at the Angoulême International Comics Festival 2019

Matsumoto has cited Moebius, Enki Bilal, Katsuhiro Otomo, Shotaro Ishinomori and Tsuchida Seiki as influences on his work. He has been influenced by the New Wave movement in manga.

== Reception ==
His work has been translated in English as early as 1997, which makes him one of the earlier manga artists whose work was translated. The early English-language translations of his work were commercially not successful, but were later seen as important on shaping appreciation for alternative manga. Later re-releases were positively received.

Ping Pong and Blue Spring have been adapted into live-action feature films. Animation studio Studio 4°C adapted Tekkonkinkreet into an animated feature film, it was released in Japan in late 2006, and both the anime and manga have been published in English.

Matsumoto influenced younger manga artists like Eiichiro Oda, Masashi Kishimoto, and Daisuke Igarashi.

He has won several awards, including the Shogakukan Manga Award, the Tezuka Osamu Cultural Prize and Eisner Award:

Award	Year	Category	Recipient(s)	Result	Ref.
Japan Cartoonists Association Award	2001		GoGo Monster	Won	
Japan Media Arts Festival	2001	Manga Award	GoGo Monster	Jury selection	
Japan Media Arts Festival	2003	Manga Award	No. 5	Jury selection	
Japan Media Arts Festival	2007	Manga Award	Takemitsu Zamurai	Won	
Japan Media Arts Festival	2016		Sunny	Won	
Eisner Awards	2008		Tekkonkinkreet	Won	
Eisner Awards	2020		Cats of the Louvre	Won	
Eisner Awards	2025		Tokyo These Days	Won	
Tezuka Osamu Cultural Prize	2011		Takemitsu Zamurai	Won	
Cartoonist Studio Prize	2014		Sunny	Won	
Shogakukan Manga Award	2016		Sunny	Won	
Los Angeles Times Book Prize	2025	Graphic Novel/Comics	Tokyo These Days	Won	

== Personal life ==
Matsumoto's wife is manga artist Saho Tono, who collaborated with him on Takemitsu Zamurai and Sunny. He is the cousin of Santa Inoue, another manga artist.

== Works ==
Title	Year	Notes	Refs
Straight (ストレート)	1989	Morning, Kodansha Comics, 2 volumes	
Zero	1990–91	Big Comic Spirits, 2 volumes	
Chaoanfanteriburu (チャオアンファンテリブル, Chao Anne fan Terrible); Taiyo Matsumoto / Katsuki Tanaka / Hiro Sugiyama	1992	Tokyo Comic Insider, 1 volume	
Hanaotoko (花男, A Boy Meet a Papa and Baseball)	1992	Big Comics, Big Spirits Comics Special, 3 volumes	
Blue Spring	1993	Anthology collection of short stories Published by Shogakukan, 1 volume	
Tekkonkinkreet (鉄コン筋クリート, Tekkonkinkurīto)/Black & White	1993–94	Serialized in Big Comic Spirits; Published by Shogakukan, 3 volumes	
Brothers of Japan (日本の兄弟, Nihon no Kyōdai)	1995	Mag Comics, 1 volume	
100	1995	Big spirits comic special, 2 volumes	
Ping Pong	1996–97	Serialized in Big Comic Spirits; Published by Shogakukan, 5 volumes	
GoGo Monster	2000	Published by Shogakukan, 1 volume	
No. 5	2000–05	Serialized in Monthly Ikki magazine Published by Shogakukan in 8 volumes	
Hana (花, Flower)	2002	stage play adapted to manga novella, 1 volume	
Takemitsu Zamurai (竹光侍) with Issei Eifuku (writer)	2006–10	Serialized in Big Comic Spirits; Published by Shogakukan, 8 volumes	
Sunny	2010–15	Serialized in Monthly Ikki and Monthly Big Comic Spirits; Published by Shogakukan, 6 volumes	
Cats of the Louvre (ルーヴルの猫, Rūvuru no Neko)	2016–17	Issued by the Louvre museum, 2 volumes	
Tokyo These Days (東京ヒゴロ, Tokyo Higoro)	2019–2023	Serialized in Big Comic Original Zōkan; Published by Shogakukan, 3 volumes	
Mukashi no Hanashi (むかしのはなし) with Issei Eifuku (writer)	2020–present	Serialized in Big Comic Superior magazine	
Nanbanjin with Cyril Pedrosa	2026–present	Serialized in Big Comic Original	
