= Tekkonkinkreet =

Japanese manga series

- First tankōbon volume cover, featuring Black

鉄コン筋クリート (Tekkonkinkreet)
- Genre: Coming-of-age; Surreal fantasy; Urban fantasy
- Manga
- Written by: Taiyō Matsumoto
- Published by: Shogakukan
- English publisher: NA: Viz Media
- Magazine: Big Comic Spirits
- English magazine: NA: Pulp
- Original run: July 5, 1993 – March 21, 1994
- Volumes: 3
- Anime film

Pilot
- Directed by: Kōji Morimoto
- Produced by: Hiroaki Takeuchi
- Studio: Studio 4°C
- Released: January 1, 1999
- Runtime: 4 minutes
- Anime film
- Directed by: Michael Arias
- Produced by: Eiko Tanaka; Eiichi Kamagata; Masao Teshima; Fumio Ueda
- Written by: Anthony Weintraub
- Music by: Plaid
- Studio: Studio 4°C
- Licensed by: Sony Pictures; NA: GKIDS
- Released: December 23, 2006
- Runtime: 111 minutes
- icon

Tekkonkinkreet (Japanese: 鉄コン筋クリート, Hepburn: Tekkonkinkurīto (Note: A child's mispronunciation of tekkin konkurīto (鉄筋コンクリート; "steel-reinforced concrete").)), also known as Black & White, is a Japanese manga series written and illustrated by Taiyō Matsumoto, originally serialized from 1993 to 1994 in Shogakukan's seinen manga magazine Big Comic Spirits. The story takes place in the fictional city of Takaramachi (Treasure Town) and centers on a pair of orphaned street kids – the tough, canny Black and the childish, innocent White, together known as the Cats – as they deal with yakuza attempting to take over Treasure Town.

A pilot film directed by Kōji Morimoto was released in January 1999. A feature-length anime film directed by Michael Arias and animated by Studio 4°C premiered in Japan in December 2006.

== Plot ==
The story follows two orphans, Black (クロ, Kuro) and White (シロ, Shiro), who dominate the streets of Takaramachi, a once-prosperous metropolis now reduced to a violent slum controlled by warring gangs. Black is a ruthless street fighter who views the city as his territory, while White exhibits childlike innocence and often retreats into fantasy. Despite their differences, they form an inseparable bond, calling themselves "the Cats".

Their lives change when Black assaults three yakuza enforcers working for Snake (蛇, Hebi), a corporate leader planning to demolish Takaramachi and replace it with a theme park. After multiple failed assassination attempts, Snake deploys three enhanced killers—Dragon, Butterfly, and Tiger—to eliminate them. White kills Dragon in self-defense but is severely wounded by Butterfly. Authorities take White into protective custody, leaving Black alone and vulnerable to his growing violent impulses.

A parallel narrative follows Kimura (木村), an ordinary man drawn into yakuza conflicts. Forced to murder his mentor Suzuki (鈴木) on Snake's orders, Kimura rebels and kills Snake before attempting to escape with his pregnant wife. He is assassinated before leaving the city.

Without White, Black descends into madness, developing a destructive alter ego called the "minotaur". When White returns, he finds Black hallucinating at a fair, clutching a doll he believes is his friend. After the doll is destroyed in another attack, Black nearly succumbs to his violent persona before overcoming it and reuniting with White. The story ends with them playing together on a beach, their bond restored.

== Media ==
=== Manga ===
Written and illustrated by Taiyō Matsumoto, Tekkonkinkreet was serialized in Shogakukan's seinen manga magazine Big Comic Spirits from the July 5, 1993, to the March 21, 1994, issues. Shogakukan collected its chapters in three wide-ban volumes, released from February 7, 1994, to May 30, 1994. Shogakukan republished the series in a single volume on December 15, 2006.

In North America, the series was renamed Black & White, and start publishing in the first issue of Viz Media's Pulp in December 1997, along with Strain, Dance till Tomorrow and Banana Fish. The manga completed two-thirds of its run in the magazine, and in September 1999, it was replaced by Bakune Young. Viz Media published the three volumes from March 8, 1999, to November 30, 2000. In 2007, Viz Media released the series into a single volume, with the title Tekkonkinkreet: Black & White, on September 25, 2007. A "30th Anniversary Edition" volume was released on November 28, 2023.

==== Volumes ====
No.	Original release date	Original ISBN	English release date	English ISBN
1	February 7, 1994	4-09-184731-5	March 8, 1999	1-56931-322-9
2	April 4, 1994	4-09-184732-3	January 5, 2000	1-56931-432-2
3	May 30, 1994	4-09-184733-1	November 30, 2000	1-56931-490-X

=== Anime films ===
==== Pilot ====
A CG-animated pilot film was released in 1999. The film was directed by Kōji Morimoto and had character models designed by Naoko Sugita. Hiroaki Takeuchi was the producer, Lee Fulton was the animation supervisor, and the 2006 feature-length film's director, Michael Arias, served as CG director. The entire 4-minute short was completed with a staff of 12 people.

==== 2006 film ====
A feature-length anime film adaptation, directed by Michael Arias and animated by Studio 4°C was released in Japan by Asmik Ace Entertainment on December 23, 2006. The city featured in Tekkonkinkreet was deemed as "the central character of the film" and the city's design was inspired by the cityscapes of Tokyo, Japan; Hong Kong; Shanghai, China; and Colombo, Sri Lanka to give a pan-Asian feel to the city. The English electronic music duo Plaid composed the music. Asian Kung-Fu Generation performed the theme song for the film "Aru Machi no Gunjō".

The film was distributed worldwide by Sony Pictures Home Entertainment. On May 6, 2026, GKIDS announced that it had acquired the North American rights to the film and screened in theaters a new 4K remaster of the film for its 20th anniversary on May 31 and June 1.

The film featured the following cast:

Character	Japanese Cast	English Cast**
Black/The Minotaur	Kazunari Ninomiya	Scott Menville
White	Yū Aoi	Elliot Fletcher
Kimura	Yūsuke Iseya	Rick Gomez
Sawada	Kankurō Kudō	Tom Kenny
Suzuki aka Rat	Min Tanaka	David Lodge
Gramps	Rokurō Naya	
Fujimura	Tomomichi Nishimura	Maurice LaMarche
The Boss	Mugihito	John DiMaggio
Choco	Nao Ōmori	Alex Fernandez
Vanilla	Yoshinori Okada	Quinton Flynn
Gamers	Morisanchuu	
Dawn	Yukiko Tamaki	Yuri Lowenthal
Dusk	Mayumi Yamaguchi	Phil LaMarr
Akutso*	Harumi Asoi	
Yasuda*	Atsushi Imaizuma	
Ocohima*	Bryan Burton-Lewis	
Snake	Masahiro Motoki	Dwight Schultz
Kimura's Wife*	Marina Inoue	Kate Higgins
The Doctor*	Osamu Kobayashi	Steven Jay Blum
The Three Assassins (Dragon, Butterfly and Tiger)		Crispin Freeman; Dave Wittenberg; Matt McKenzie

* - Minor Role
** - Not credited on the DVD

=== Stage play ===
A stage play adaptation, starring Nogizaka46's former member Yumi Wakatsuki as Black and Mito Natsume as White, ran at the Galaxy Theatre in Tokyo from November 18–25, 2018.

== Reception ==
=== Manga ===
Tekkonkinkreet has been generally well received by critics, particularly for its distinctive artwork and narrative. Jason Henderson of Mania.com observed that the manga blended Japanese storytelling with European visual aesthetics, creating a unique fusion in its third volume. Matthew J. Brady of Manga Life awarded the series an "A" grade, praising its unconventional art style, which he compared to Western artists Brandon Graham, Corey Lewis, and Bryan Lee O'Malley. He also highlighted the believable dynamic between the protagonists despite their exaggerated abilities.

Shaenon K. Garrity described the manga as visually stunning, with a kinetic, graffiti-influenced style that complemented its energetic storytelling. She emphasized the emotional depth of the central characters' relationship, calling it the heart of the narrative. Scott Campbell of Active Anime praised its thematic ambiguity and visual hybridity, blending grunge and cyberpunk aesthetics while exploring humanity's relationship with urban environments. Sandra Scholes, also writing for Active Anime, called it a "one off masterpiece", lauding its rough yet expressive art and its balance of grit and humor.

Joseph Luster of Otaku USA highlighted the emotional core of the story—the bond between the protagonists Black and White—and noted that while Matsumoto's art might polarize readers, its distinctiveness was captivating. Deb Aoki of About.com rated it 4.5/5 stars, acknowledging its chaotic yet imaginative cityscapes while emphasizing its poignant exploration of innocence and corruption.

Kai-Ming Cha of Publishers Weekly, ranked Tekkon Kinkreet: Black and White first on the "Top 10 Manga for 2007".

=== Film ===
The film holds a 77% rating on review aggregator website Rotten Tomatoes based on 22 reviews, and an average score of 65 on Metacritic based on 9 critics.

Chris Beveridge, writing in Mania, declared: "While it may not be what anime fans have come to expect for a traditional film, the end result is something that while predictable is surprisingly engaging." Chris Johnston of Newtype USA wrote: "Regardless of how much you watch this one, though, this is a film that no serious anime fan should miss".

== Awards ==
=== Manga ===
The manga won the 2008 Eisner Award for "Best U.S. Edition of International Material—Japan".

=== Film ===
Tekkonkinkreet won the "Best Film Award" at the 2006 Mainichi Film Awards. It was also named Barbara London's top film of 2006 in the annual "Best of" roundup by the New York Museum of Modern Art's Artforum magazine. In 2008, it received "Best Original Story" and "Best Art Direction" from the Tokyo International Anime Fair. It won the 2008 Japan Academy Prize for Animation of the Year.
