= Sunny (manga) =

Japanese manga series by Taiyō Matsumoto

- First wide-ban volume cover, featuring Haruo Yano
- Genre: Drama; Slice of life
- Manga
- Written by: Taiyō Matsumoto
- Published by: Shogakukan
- English publisher: NA: Viz Media
- Imprint: Ikki Comix
- Magazine: Monthly Ikki (2010–2014); Monthly Big Comic Spirits (2015)
- Original run: December 25, 2010 – July 27, 2015
- Volumes: 6
- Anime film
- Directed by: Michael Arias
- Studio: Dwarf Studios
- Licensed by: GKIDS
- Released: 2029
- icon

Sunny is a Japanese manga series written and illustrated by Taiyō Matsumoto. It was serialized in Shogakukan's seinen manga magazine Monthly Ikki from December 2010 to September 2014, when the magazine ceased publication. It was later transferred to Monthly Big Comic Spirits, being serialized from January to July 2015. Its chapters were collected in six wide-ban volumes. The manga was licensed for English release in North America by Viz Media. In April 2025, an anime film adaptation produced by Dwarf Studios was announced, which is slated for completion in 2029.

Sunny won the 61st Shogakukan Manga Award in the general category in 2016 and received an Excellence Award at the 20th Japan Media Arts Festival in 2017.

== Plot ==
Sunny is the story about the foster children of the Star Kids home, a combination group home/orphanage facility. They struggle with both the everyday issues of growing up and those specific of being abandoned or orphaned children. Their only way out from their situation is the Sunny, a dilapidated old car in the front lawn of the home. The Sunny is used by the children to go magically wherever they want, travel the world, go into space, or just find a refuge from the troubles of reality.

== Characters ==
Haruo Yano (矢野 春男, Yano Haruo)
Also referred as "White" (ホワイト, Howaito), is a rebellious white-haired boy who is usually fantasizing inside the Sunny and getting into fights. He deeply cares about the other kids at the home, getting in trouble if it requires it to help them. His mother left him in the Star Kids and they reunite on occasion. Haruo keeps a round tin of Nivea which reminds him her smell.
Sei Yamashita (山下 静, Yamashita Sei)
A bespectacled smart quiet boy and a newcomer to the Star Kids. He feels uneasy at the home and does not really try at the beginning to connect with the other kids, believing that his parents will come back any day now.
Junsuke (純助)
An artistic, musically-inclined and playful boy. He was sent to the home along with his little brother Shosuke (笑介). They visit their ill mother at the hospital.
Megumu (めぐむ)
A sensitive girl, burdened with the memories of a caring family since her parents died. She fears dying alone and wants no one else to leave her. Megumu always thinks the best of others and tries to be a "normal" girl. She is befriended with Kiko.
Kiko (きい子, Kīko)
A scandalous and whining girl, defensive of her peers. Her mother left her in the Star Kids.
Kenji Ito (伊東 研二, Itō Kenji)
A teenager and one of the older kids at the home. He is nicknamed "Horny Kenji" after his porn magazines were found inside the Sunny. He is the son of an alcoholic father. He does not know what he wants out of life and even tried to drop out of school.
Asako Ito (伊東 朝子, Itō Asako)
Kenji's older sister and high school student. She also takes care of the kids at the Star Kids.
Taro (たろう, Tarō)
An obese large man with an undisclosed mental issue who is usually wandering around the home, picking flowers and singing nursery rhymes. He also serves as a guardian of the home and the kids.
Minoru Adachi (足立 稔, Adachi Minoru)
Mr. Adachi is the caretaker of the Star Kids, along with Miss Mitsuko. He is a compassionate and patient man who is always looking for the well-being of the kids.
Makio (牧男)
The grandson of the Star Kids housemaster. He is admired by the kids, specially by Haruo. He is a college student, but is aimlessly searching for his purpose in life.

== Production ==
Since his debut, Matsumoto had planned to write a manga about his experience living in a children's care home for six years when he was young. However, he thought it would have been strange to start his career as a manga artist with that theme. He also said that Sunny is not autobiographical, though some parts are close to his experiences. Others were mostly made up. He added that he initially planned to make it more autobiographical but could not make it work, so it wound up being "half real and half fiction." For the series, Matsumoto decided to use the Kansai dialect for dialogue to make the story more lighthearted. Previously, Matsumoto's works were noted for their lack of female characters. In Sunny, however, they are more prominent because Matsumoto based the work on his experience, and half of the children in the home were girls. His wife helped him draw the female characters.

== Media ==
=== Manga ===
Written and illustrated by Taiyō Matsumoto, Sunny was serialized in Shogakukan's seinen manga magazine Monthly Ikki from December 25, 2010, until September 25, 2014, when Ikki suspended its publication. The manga was later transferred to Monthly Big Comic Spirits and serialized from January 27 to July 27, 2015. Shogakukan collected its chapters in six wide-ban volumes, released from August 30, 2011, to October 30, 2015.

The manga has been licensed for English-language release by Viz Media in 2012. The six volumes were released from May 21, 2013, to November 15, 2016.

==== Volumes ====
No.	Original release date	Original ISBN	English release date	English ISBN
1	August 30, 2011	978-4-09-188557-9	May 21, 2013	978-1-4215-5525-6
01. "'Where's Yokohama?' 'I dunno, somewhere 'round Tokyo?'" (「横浜ってどこにあるんやろ？」 「知らんわ、東京の辺ちゃうか」, `Yoko Hamatte Doko ni Aru N'yaro?' `Shiran wa, Tōkyō no Hen Chau ka'); 02. "'Why're Dracula's fingernails so long?' ''Cause he doesn't cut 'em.'" (「ドラキュラの爪てなんで長いんやろ？」 「そら切らへんからや」, `Dorakyura no Tsumete Nande Nagai N'yaro?' `Sora Kirahenkara ya'); 03. "'Why do girls always cry?' ''Cause almost nothin' can beat a girl's tears.'" (「女子てなんですぐ泣くんやろ？」 「おんなの涙は、ほぼ無敵なんや」, `Joshite Nande Sugu Naku N'yaro?' `On'nanonamida wa, Hobo Mutekina n ya'); 04. "'Whaddya wanna be when you grow up?' 'A spy and a racecar driver and a boxing champion.'" (「大人になったら何になりたい？」 「スパイでレーサーでボクサーのチャンピョンや」, `Otona ni Nattara Nani ni Naritai?' `Supai de Rēsā de Bokusā no Chanpyon ya'); 05. "'Whaddya do when ya feel like cryin' at night?' 'Me, I sing.'" (「夜来て泣きたなったら、どないする？」 「オレ、歌うわ」, `Yoru Kite Nakita Nattara, Do nai Suru?' `Ore, Utau wa'); 06. "'Whaddya think's for dinner tonight?' 'Miss Mitsuko said fritters.'" (「今日の晩ごはん、なんやろ？」 「みつこさん、コロッケや言うてたで」, `Kyō no Ban Gohan, na N'yaro?' `Mitsuko-san, Korokke ya Yuute Tade')
2	February 29, 2012	978-4-09-188576-0	November 19, 2013	978-1-4215-5526-3
07. "'When I get married I wanna wear a dress in a chapel.' 'What's a chapel?'" (「結婚式はドレス着てチャペルでやりたいねん」 「チャペルて何？」, `Kekkonshiki wa Doresu Kite Chaperu de Yaritai nen' `Chaperu Tenani?'); 08. "'What's a guppy a baby of?' 'A guppy is a baby guppy.'" (「メダカって何の子どもなの？」 「メダカはメダカの子どもだよ」, `Medaka Ttenani no Kodomona no?' `Medaka wa Medaka no Kodomoda yo'); 09. "'The sun is great! It comes back every morning.' 'The earth's goin' around it, y'know.'" (「お日さまて、えらいわ。毎朝かならず来てくれはる」 「地球がまわっとんねん」, `O-bi-samate, Erai wa. Maiasa Kanarazu Kite Kure Haru' `Chikyū ga Mawatton nen'); 10. "'Humans can fly if they have the guts.' 'Okay, so fly!'" (「人間、根性あったら空かて飛べんねんで」 「よっしゃ、飛べ」, `Ningen, Konjō Attara Sukate Toben Nende' `Yossha, Tobe'); 11. "'I wanna see her as much as I don't wanna see her.' 'Well, I do wanna see her!'" (「会いたいのんとおなじぐらい会いたくないねん」 「オレは会いたいっ！」, `Aitai non to Onaji Kurai Aitakunai nen' `Ore wa Aita i~tsu!'); 12. "'The city always seems angry.' 'Like it's shoutin' "HEY!" or somethin'?'" (「街ってずっと怒っとるみたいや」 「コラー言うて？」, `Machi tte Zutto Okottoru Mitai ya' `Korā Yuute?')
3	January 30, 2013	978-4-09-188613-2	April 15, 2014	978-1-4215-5969-8
13. "'When it snows, it's like the whole world is up above the clouds.'" (「雪ふったら、せかいが雲の上みたいや」, `Yuki Futtara, se kai ga Kumonoue Mitai ya'); 14. "'I wanna be like Makio when I grow up.' 'Yeah, me too.'" (「オレ、まきおさんみたいな大人になりたいわ」 「オレかって、なりたいわ」, `Ore, Maki Osan Mitaina Otona ni Naritai wa' `Ore ka tte, Naritai wa'); 15. "'Madam, teatime has arrived.' 'Most grateful for the invitation, thank you. Tee hee hee.'" (「おくさま、お茶の時間ですわよ」 「およばれしますわでございますわよ。おほほ」, `O Kusa ma, Ocha no Jikandesu wa yo' `Oyoba re Shimasu Wadegozaimasu wa yo. O Hoho'); 16. "'What if a talent scout spots us on TV?' 'A star is born!'" (「テレビ出てスカウトされたらどないしよ」 「スター誕生や」, `Terebi Dete Sukauto sa Retarado nai Shiyo' `Sutā Tanjō ya'); 17. "'If I had my own department store, I'd make every floor for toys.' 'That's just a big toy store.'" (「オレのデパートあったら、ぜんぶの階オモチャ売り場にするわ」 「それはでっかいオモチャ屋いうねん」, `Ore no Depāto Attara, Zenbu no Kai Omocha Uriba ni Suru wa' `Sore wa Dekkai Omocha-ya iu Nen'); 18. "'Cat goes "meow meow", dog goes "bow wow".' 'Pig goes "oink oink", cow goes "moo moo".'" (「猫、ニャンニャニャン 犬、ワンワンワン」 「豚、ブーブーブー 牛、モーモーモー」, `Neko, Nyan' Nya Nyan Inu, Wan Wan Wan' `Buta, Bū Bū Bū Ushi, Mō Mō Mō')
4	October 30, 2013	978-4-09-188635-4	October 21, 2014	978-1-4215-7340-3
19. "'Y'think God's the one who makes it rain?' 'God's there when you feel like crying, right?'" (「神さまが、雨ふらせるんやろか？」 「神さんかって、泣きたなるとき、あるんやろ」, `Kamisama ga, Ame Fura Seru N'yaro ka?' `Kami-san Katte, Nakita Naru Toki, aru N'yaro'); 20. "'I hate daikon.' 'Yeah, it smells like farts.'" (「ダイコン嫌いや」 「なんや、おならのにおいする」, `Daikon-girai ya' `Nan ya, Onara no Nioi Suru'); 21. "'What do sweethearts do together?' 'Hold hands and smooch.'" (「こいびとどうしって、ナニするん？」 「おててつないで、チューするねん」, `Koi Bito-dōshi tte, Nani Suru n?' `O Tete Tsunaide, Chū Suru Nen'); 22. "'There they go, monkeyin' around.' 'Yeah, monkeyin' around...'" (「はしゃいどるのぉ...」 「はしゃいどるでぇ〜」, `Hashi ~Yaidoruno~o...' `Hashi ~Yaidorude~e 〜'); 23. "'Granny Smith apples are green, right?' 'Call 'em "green apples".'" (「あおリンゴって、みどりとちゃうん？」 「みどりんご！」, `Ao Ringo tte, Midori to Chau n?' `Midori n Go!'); 24. "'Auoooh.' 'Waaaaa.'" (「あうあうあ」 「うぉううぉ」, `Au au a' `u ~ouu~o')
5	May 30, 2014	978-4-09-188654-5	July 7, 2015	978-1-4215-7972-6
25. "'Gonna be a sot hummer!' 'My throb hurts!'" (「あつがなついわ」 「ドキがむね！」, `Atsu ga Natsui wa' `Doki ga Mune!'); 26. "'Jus' like when 3,000 Leagues in Search of Mother.' 'Is 3,000 leagues far?'" (「母をたずねて三千里やね」 「さんぜんりって遠いんか？」, `Haha o Tazunete Sanzenri ya ne' `Sanzenri tte Tōi n ka?'); 27. "'My nose is so runny I think my brain's leakin' out.' 'You ain't even got a brain anymore!'" (「こないいっぱいはな水でたら、脳みそでてまう」 「ほな、お前もう脳みそないで」, `Konai Ippai Hana Mizudetara, Nōmi Sodete Mau' `Hona, Omae mō Nōmi Sonaide'); 28. "'Horny-Ken's in a good mood, dont'cha know.' 'Prob'ly found some money.'" (「エロケン、ごきげんやな」 「でもひろたんやろ」, `Eroken, Goki Gen'ya na' `Demo Hirota N'yaro'); 29. "'You think a rainbow's hot if you touch it?' 'The blue part's gotta be cold.'" (「虹って、さわったらあついんやろか？」 「青い部分は、つべたいやろ」, `Niji tte, Sawattara Atsui N'yaro ka?' `Aoi Bubun wa, Tsubetaiyaro'); 30. "'Where d'ya think birds sleep during a storm?'" (「台風きとる日は、鳥たちどこでねるんやろ？」, `Taifūki Toru hi wa, Tori-tachi Doko de Neru N'yaro?')
6	October 30, 2015	978-4-09-188685-9	November 15, 2016	978-1-4215-8860-5
31. "'Five frantic fat frogs fled.' 'Fifty fierce fuzzy fishes.'" (「カエルピョコピョコミピョコピョコ」 「あわせてボコボコムボコボコ」, `Kaeru Pyoko Pyoko mi Pyoko Pyoko' `Awasete Boko Boko mu Boko Boko'); 32. "'I love amusement parks.' 'When I grow up, I'm gonna live in one!'" (「ゆうえんち好きや」「大人になったらゆうえんちでくらすわ」, `Yū en Chi Suki ya'`Otona ni Nattara Yū en Chide Kurasu wa'); 33. "'Horny-Ken's horny!' 'Horny corny thorny!'" (「エロケンはエロエロ」 「エッチスケッチワンタッチ」, `Eroken wa Eroero' `Etchi Suketchi Wantatchi'); 34. "'The sky's blushing y'see.' 'It's turnin' red, y'see.'" (「空てれとんねん」 「真っ赤になっとんねん」, `Sora Tere Ton Nen' `Makka ni Natton Nen'); 35. "'Virgo, Capicorn' 'Unicorn, popcorn'" (「おとめ座、やぎ座...」 「モナリザ、便座」, `Otome-za, Yagi-za...' `Monariza, Benza'); 36. "'Home again, home again.' 'Welcome back.'" (「ただいま ただいま」 「おかえりなさい」, `Tadaima Tadaima' `Okaerinasai'); Final Chapter. "'Rainy now, cloudy later.' 'Cloudy now, clear skies later.'" (「雨のちくもり」 「くもりのち晴れ」, `Ame no Chiku Mori' `Kumori Nochi Hare')

=== Anime film ===
On April 17, 2025, Variety announced that Michael Arias will direct an anime film adaptation slated for completion in 2029. It will be animated by Dwarf Studios and produced by GKIDS. The film featured at Cannes Film Festival's Annecy Animation Showcase on May 18, 2025, during Animation Day.

== Reception ==
Sunny was one of the Jury Recommended Works at the 15th and 16th Japan Media Arts Festival in 2011 and 2012, and received an Excellence Award at the 20th edition in 2017. In 2016, the manga won the 61st Shogakukan Manga Award in the general category, sharing it with Umimachi Diary. It won the award for Best Graphic Novel at the 2nd Cartoonist Studio Prize. It was nominated for Best American Edition of Foreign Material at the 2014 Harvey Awards. It was also picked as a nominee for 'Best Comic' in the 42nd and the 44th annual Angoulême International Comics Festival held in 2015 and 2017 respectively.

The first volume of Sunny was chosen as one of the Great Graphic Novels 2014 in the fiction section by the Young Adult Library Services Association. It was one of the fifty manga titles selected for a manga exhibition about the promotion of human rights, held by the Tokyo Metropolitan Human Rights Promotion Center in 2015.

On Anime News Network, Rebecca Silverman gave the first volume an overall grade of B+. Greg McElhatton of Comic Book Resources praised the art and claimed it was "the most accessible Matsumoto manga to date" in his review of the first volume. Publishers Weekly wrote that the author "deftly weaves a sense of longing and sadness into even the most chaotic scenes, and readers are drawn into the lives of children struggling to be themselves in a world that doesn't want them."
