= Tokyo These Days =

Japanese manga series

- Cover of the first volume

東京ヒゴロ (Tokyo Higoro)
- Genre: Drama
- Manga
- Written by: Taiyō Matsumoto
- Published by: Shogakukan
- English publisher: NA: Viz Media
- Magazine: Big Comic Original Zōkan
- Original run: June 12, 2019 – June 12, 2023
- Volumes: 3
- icon

Tokyo These Days (Japanese: 東京ヒゴロ, Hepburn: Tokyo Higoro) is a Japanese manga series written and illustrated by Taiyō Matsumoto. It was serialized in Shogakukan's seinen manga magazine Big Comic Original Zōkan from June 2019 to June 2023, with its chapters collected in three wideban volumes.

== Publication ==
Written and illustrated by Taiyō Matsumoto, Tokyo These Days was serialized in Shogakukan's seinen manga magazine Big Comic Original Zōkan from June 12, 2019, to June 12, 2023. Shogakukan collected its chapters in three wideban volumes, released from August 30, 2021, to October 30, 2023.

In June 2023, Viz Media announced that it had licensed the manga for an English release in North America. The three volumes were released from January 16 to September 17, 2024.

=== Volumes ===
No.	Original release date	Original ISBN	English release date	English ISBN
1	August 30, 2021	978-4-09-861117-1	January 16, 2024	978-1-9747-3880-9
2	September 30, 2022	978-4-09-861450-9	May 21, 2024	978-1-9747-4349-0
3	October 30, 2023	978-4-09-862642-7	September 17, 2024	978-1-9747-4889-1

== Reception ==
Tokyo These Days ranked fifth on Takarajimasha's Kono Manga ga Sugoi! 2022 list of best manga for male readers. The manga placed first on "The Best Manga 2022 Kono Manga wo Yome!" ranking by Freestyle magazine; it ranked fifth on the 2023 edition; and third on the 2024 edition. It was nominated for the 27th Tezuka Osamu Cultural Prize in 2023; it was also nominated for the 28th edition in 2024. The series won in the Graphic Novel/Comic category of the 45th Los Angeles Times Book Prize in 2025. The manga won the Eisner Awards's Best U.S. Edition of International Material—Asia category in 2025. It was nominated for the Harvey Awards in the Best Manga category in the same year.

Writer and editor Kazushi Shimada ranked it second on his top 10 manga of 2021.
