= No. 5 (manga) =

Japanese manga series by Taiyō Matsumoto

- First volume cover

ナンバーファイブ (Nanbā Faibu)
- Genre: Science fiction, thriller
- Manga
- Written by: Taiyō Matsumoto
- Published by: Shogakukan
- English publisher: NA: Viz Media
- Imprint: Big Comics Ikki
- Magazine: Monthly Ikki
- English magazine: NA: Pulp
- Original run: November 30, 2000 – January 25, 2005
- Volumes: 8
- icon

No. 5 (Japanese: ナンバーファイブ, Hepburn: Nanbā Faibu) is a Japanese manga series written and illustrated by Taiyō Matsumoto. It was serialized in Shogakukan's seinen manga magazine Monthly Ikki from November 2000 to January 2005. Shogakukan compiled its chapters into eight wideban volumes.

In North America, Viz Media released the series' first two volumes in 2002 and 2003, but due to low sales it was discontinued. Viz Media republished the series in a four-volume omnibus edition from July 2021 to April 2022.

== Publication ==
Written and illustrated by Taiyō Matsumoto, No. 5 started in the first issue of Shogakukan's Spirits Zōkan Ikki (re-branded as Monthly Ikki in 2003), released on November 30, 2000. The series finished on January 25, 2005. Shogakukan collected its chapters into eight wideban volumes, released from November 30, 2001, to February 28, 2005. Shogakukan would later re-released the series into four deluxe volumes from November 30 to December 26, 2005.

In North America, Viz Media announced the license of the series in December 2001. A preview for the then forthcoming first volume was published in the January 2002 issue of Pulp. Viz Media published the first volume on April 5, 2002, and the second on August 13, 2003. After having released these two volumes, Viz Media ceased the series' publication due to low sales. In 2011, the series was completely available in English language via the No. 5 app on iTunes. In October 2020, Viz Media announced that they would re-publish the series in a four-volume deluxe edition, in print and digital formats, released from July 20, 2021, to April 19, 2022.

=== Volumes ===
Note: All chapters titles are written in English on the original Japanese release.

No.	Original release date	Original ISBN	English release date	English ISBN
1	November 30, 2001; November 21, 2001 (SE)	4-09-188201-3; 4-09-941191-5 (SE)	April 5, 2002 (1st edition); July 20, 2021 (2nd edition)	978-1-56931-738-9 (1st edition); 978-1-9747-2076-7 (2nd edition)
1. desert 2. flowers; 3. cemetery 4. restaurant
2	November 30, 2001	4-09-188202-1	August 13, 2003 (1st edition); July 20, 2021 (2nd edition)	978-1-59116-056-4 (1st edition); 978-1-9747-2076-7 (2nd edition)
5. forest 6. villa; 7. village 8. park
3	March 29, 2003	4-09-188203-X	October 19, 2021	978-1-9747-2077-4
9. wonder land 10. snow field; 11. vision 12. many places
4	March 29, 2003	4-09-188204-8	October 19, 2021	978-1-9747-2077-4
13. fifteen years ago 14. ten years ago; 15. gone days 16. cottage
5	January 30, 2004	4-09-188205-6	January 18, 2022	978-1-97472-078-1
17. mountain 18. chase 19. chase 2; 20. chase 3; 21. fight
6	June 30, 2004	4-09-188206-4	January 18, 2022	978-1-97472-078-1
22. monologue 23. darkness 24. conference room; 25. on TV; 26. east
7	November 30, 2004	4-09-188207-2	April 19, 2022	978-1-9747-2079-8
27. a funeral 28. ship 29. sea; 30. in the Mike; 31. in his arms
8	February 28, 2005	4-09-188208-0	April 19, 2022	978-1-9747-2079-8
32. in the Army; 33. PAPA's Diary; 34. under stars; 35. at the table 36. Utopia; 37. future

== Reception ==
No. 5 was one of the Jury Recommended Works at the 7th Japan Media Arts Festival in 2003.
