= Franz von Wolff-Metternich =

German art historian (1893–1978)

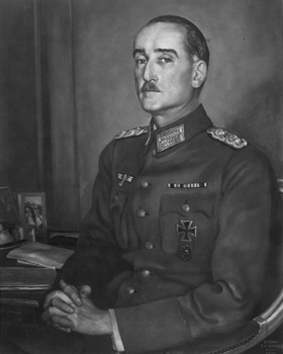
- Born: Graf Wolff Metternich, Franz; 31 December 1893; Feldhausen, Germany
- Died: 25 May 1978 (aged 84); Cologne, Germany
- Education: University of Bonn
- Occupations: Art historian, Curator, Professor,
- Awards: French Légion d'honneur

Graf Franz Wolff Metternich (31 December 1893 – 25 May 1978) was a German aristocrat, art professor, historian and curator.

== Biography ==
During World War II, he was responsible for the conservation of Rhineland and French art collections under the Kunstschutz principle, from 1940 to 1942. He was placed in contact with Jacques Jaujard, who as deputy head of the Louvre had secretly organized the evacuation of much of the Louvre art collection, which were sent into hiding to various locations across France. While Wolff Metternich had been appointed by Hitler to oversee France’s art collections, like many aristocrats he was not a Nazi member, and helped Jaujard preserve France’s art from Nazi looting.

However, in 1942, he was recalled from his post in Paris, France by the Nazis for thwarting their attempts to plunder French National art collections. He was awarded the Légion d'honneur in 1952 from President of France Charles de Gaulle at the suggestion of Jaujard.
