= Kunstschutz =

Wartime preservation of artworks

Kunstschutz (German for 'art protection') is the German term for the principle of preserving cultural heritage and artworks during armed conflict. However it is a word with a double meaning, especially during the Second World War, when the stated aim of protecting the enemy's art was often a cover for seizing art by Nazis or their allies. It is associated with the image of the "art officer" (Kunstoffizier) or "art expert" (Kunstsachverständiger) as well as with art looting organizations.

The Allies instituted a Monuments, Fine Arts, and Archives program tasked with identifying, locating, securing, storing, and returning stolen art after the war.

== History ==
=== World War I ===
The Germans' lack of respect for the international Hague Conventions on land warfare created in 1899 and 1907, which had included the protection of cultural property, led to international shock at the burning of Leuven University Library in Belgium and the bombardment of Reims Cathedral in France, both in 1914 (the Louvain library would be re-formed and rebuilt in the 1920s but destroyed again in the 1940 Battle of France).

To counter the protests, counterbalance the destruction, redeem itself in the eyes of international agencies and regain its image as the land of culture par excellence, German propaganda created the principle of Kunstschutz. The principle allowed Germany to experiment with new formulas for saving and developing cultural heritage and originated many, often fertile initiatives. Clemen, professor of art history at the University of Bonn and inspector of monuments in the Rhineland, was one of the principle's first instigators. A German soldier 'saved' cultural objects in Saint-Quentin, Aisne, though these were only returned in 1998, and a painting similarly removed from Douai museum was returned only in 2000 after it was discovered at a sale in Switzerland. The museum at Metz has put on an exhibition on the activities of its former German curator, the archaeologist Johann Baptist Keune, in protecting the artistic heritage of the Moselle during the conflict.

=== Nazi era (1933-1945) ===
After assuming power in 1933, Hitler implemented anti-semitic policies designed to humiliate and rob German Jews. Their aim was ultimately to exile or murder their victims, and steal their worldly possessions, including any artwork such as paintings, drawings and prints, as well as furniture, antiques, books, tapestries, carpets and so on. Adolf Hitler was an unsuccessful artist who was denied admission to the Vienna Academy of Fine Arts. In Mein Kampf he attacked modern art as degenerate, including: Cubism; Futurism; and Dadaism. As Chancellor of Germany, Hitler enforced his aesthetic ideal on the nation, favoring classical portraits and landscapes by Old Masters, particularly those of Germanic origin. Modern art that did not match this was dubbed degenerate art by the Third Reich, and all that was found in Germany's state museums was to be sold or destroyed.

Hitler's art dealers Hildebrand Gurlitt, Karl Buchholz, Ferdinand Moeller and Bernhard Boehmer were tasked with raising money for the Reich by selling "degenerate" art. They worked out of Schloss Niederschonhausen, just outside Berlin, to sell the near-16,000 cache of paintings and sculptures which Hitler and Göring removed from the walls of German museums in 1937–38. They were first put on display in the Haus der Kunst in Munich on 19 July 1937, with the Nazi leaders inviting public mockery by two million visitors. Propagandist Joseph Goebbels in a radio broadcast called Germany's degenerate artists "garbage". Hitler opened the Haus der Kunst exhibition with a speech, at the end of which saliva fell out of his mouth in rage. In it he described German art as suffering "a great and fatal illness".

=== Burning of artwork ===
On 20 March 1939 Hildebrand Gurlitt and his colleagues set fire to 1,004 paintings and sculptures and 3,825 watercolours, drawings and prints in the courtyard of the Berlin Fire Department. The Basel Museum in Switzerland arrived with 50,000 Swiss francs to spend. It is not known, after the burnings and the sales, how many paintings were kept by Gurlitt, Buchholz, Moeller and Boehmer and sold by them to Switzerland and America for personal gain.

While the Nazis were in power, they plundered cultural property from every territory they occupied. Some of the objects were earmarked for Hitler's never realized Führermuseum, some objects went to other high-ranking officials such as Hermann Göring, while other objects were traded to fund Nazi activities.

=== World War II ===
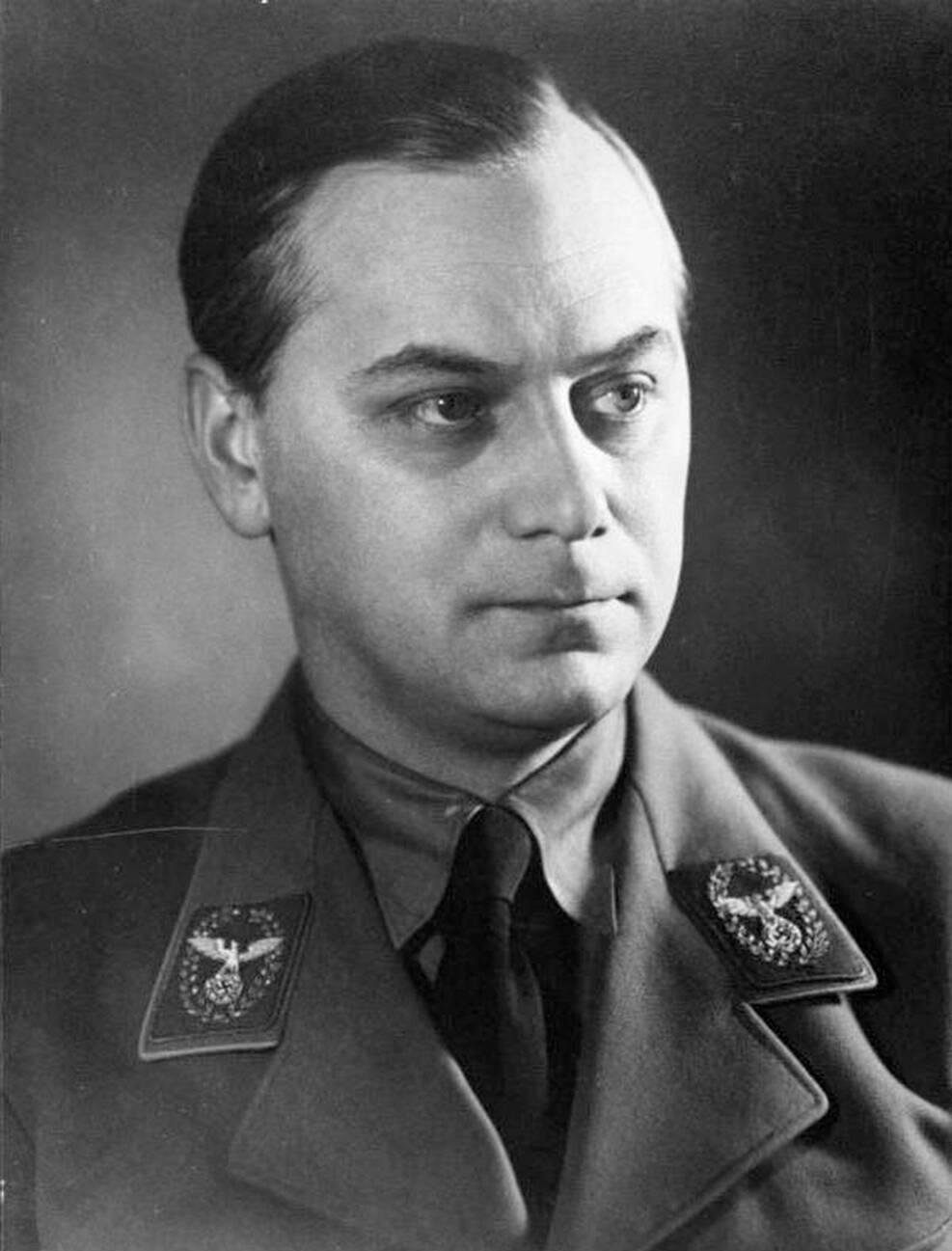
Alfred Rosenberg in 1939

In 1940, an organization known as the Einsatzstab Reichsleiter Rosenberg für die Besetzten Gebiete (The Reichsleiter Rosenberg Institute for the Occupied Territories), or ERR, was formed, headed for Alfred Rosenberg by Gerhard Utikal. The first operating unit, the western branch for France, Belgium and the Netherlands, called the Dienststelle Westen (Western Agency), was located in Paris.The chief of this Dienststelle was Kurt von Behr. Its original purpose was to collect Jewish and Freemasonic books and documents, either for destruction, or for removal to Germany for further "study". However, late in 1940, Hermann Göring, who in fact controlled the ERR, issued an order that effectively changed the mission of the ERR, mandating it to seize "Jewish" art collections and other objects. The war loot had to be collected in a central place in Paris, the Musée de jeu de Paume.

At the collection point, art historians and other personnel worked and inventoried the loot before sending it to Germany. Göring also commanded that the loot would first be divided between Hitler and himself. From late 1940 to late 1942, he went to Paris 20 times. In the Musée jeu de paume, art dealer Bruno Lohse staged 20 expositions of the newly looted art objects, especially for Göring, from which Göring selected at least 594 pieces for his own collection. Göring made Lohse his liaison-officer and installed him in the ERR in March 1941 as the deputy leader of this unit. Items which Hitler and Göring did not want were made available to other Nazi leaders. Under Rosenberg and Göring's leadership, the ERR seized 21,903 art objects from German-occupied countries.

Other Nazi looting organizations included the Dienststelle Mühlmann, operated by Kajetan Mühlmann, which Göring also controlled and operated primarily in the Netherlands, Belgium, and a Sonderkommando Kuensberg connected to the minister of foreign affairs Joachim von Ribbentrop, which operated first in France, then in Russia and North Africa.

Hitler later ordered that all confiscated works of art were to be made directly available to him. Art collections from prominent Jewish families, including the Rothschilds, the Rosenbergs and the Goudstikkers and the Schloss family were targeted because of their value. By the end of the war, the Third Reich amassed hundreds of thousands of cultural objects.

In Western Europe, with the advancing German troops, were elements of the von Ribbentrop Battalion, named after Joachim von Ribbentrop. The men were responsible for entering private and institutional libraries in the occupied countries and removing any materials of interest to the Germans, especially items of scientific, technical or other informational value.

==== Kunstschutz activities ====
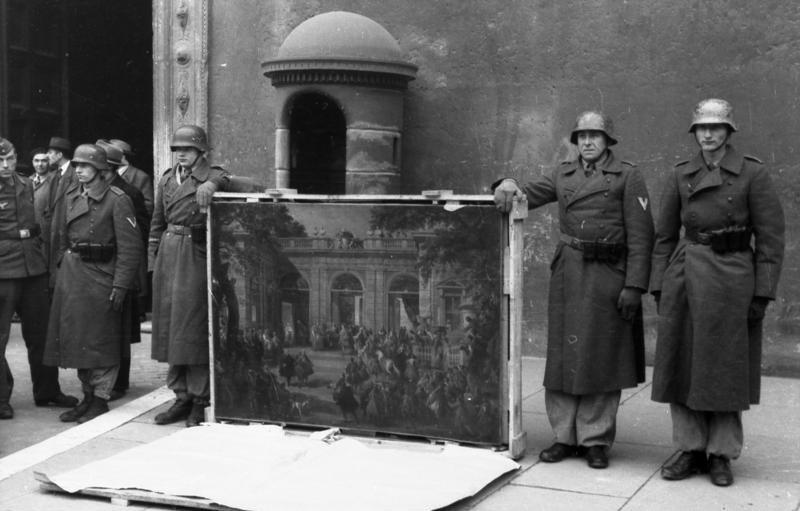
Kunstschutz troops of the Hermann Göring Division display artwork relocated from Naples, the most-heavily bombed Italian city during World War II, in a January 1944, ceremony in front of the Palazzo Venezia in Rome. The painting, Carlo III di Borbone che visita il papa Benedetto XIV nella coffee-house del Quirinale a Roma by Giovanni Paolo Pannini, was taken from the Biblioteca del Museo Nazionale di Napoli; it hangs today in the Museo di Capodimonte (inv. Q 205)

Kunstschutz's altruistic image in World War I helped conceal its looting activities in World War II. On the initiative of Marshal Hermann Göring, a specialist military corps known as the Kunstschutz was reactivated following the Armistice between Italy and Allied armed forces of September 1943 to requisition Italian artworks and transport them to Germany, under the pretext of saving them from Allied bombing. In Florence 58 crates of marble and bronze statues (by Donatello and Michelangelo among others), 26 ancient Greek statues, 291 large paintings (including works by Titian, Botticelli and Raphael) and 25 crates of smaller paintings set out for Germany and Austria in convoys which many Italian intelligence officers secretly followed and reported back on to their government and thus to the Allies. One of those officers was the antifascist Rodolfo Siviero, who transmitted his reports to the Allies via his partisan contacts and continued to hunt down and return looted and illegally acquired Italian artworks from Germany after 1945. One of those he returned was the Spiridon Leda (1505–1515) from the Leonardo da Vinci school, acquired by Göring before the war. In Naples the national museums were looted, with paintings taken including the Danaë by Titian, The Blind Leading the Blind by Pieter Bruegel the Elder, the Portrait of a young woman, known as Antea by Parmigianino and the Apollo Citharoedus from Pompeii.

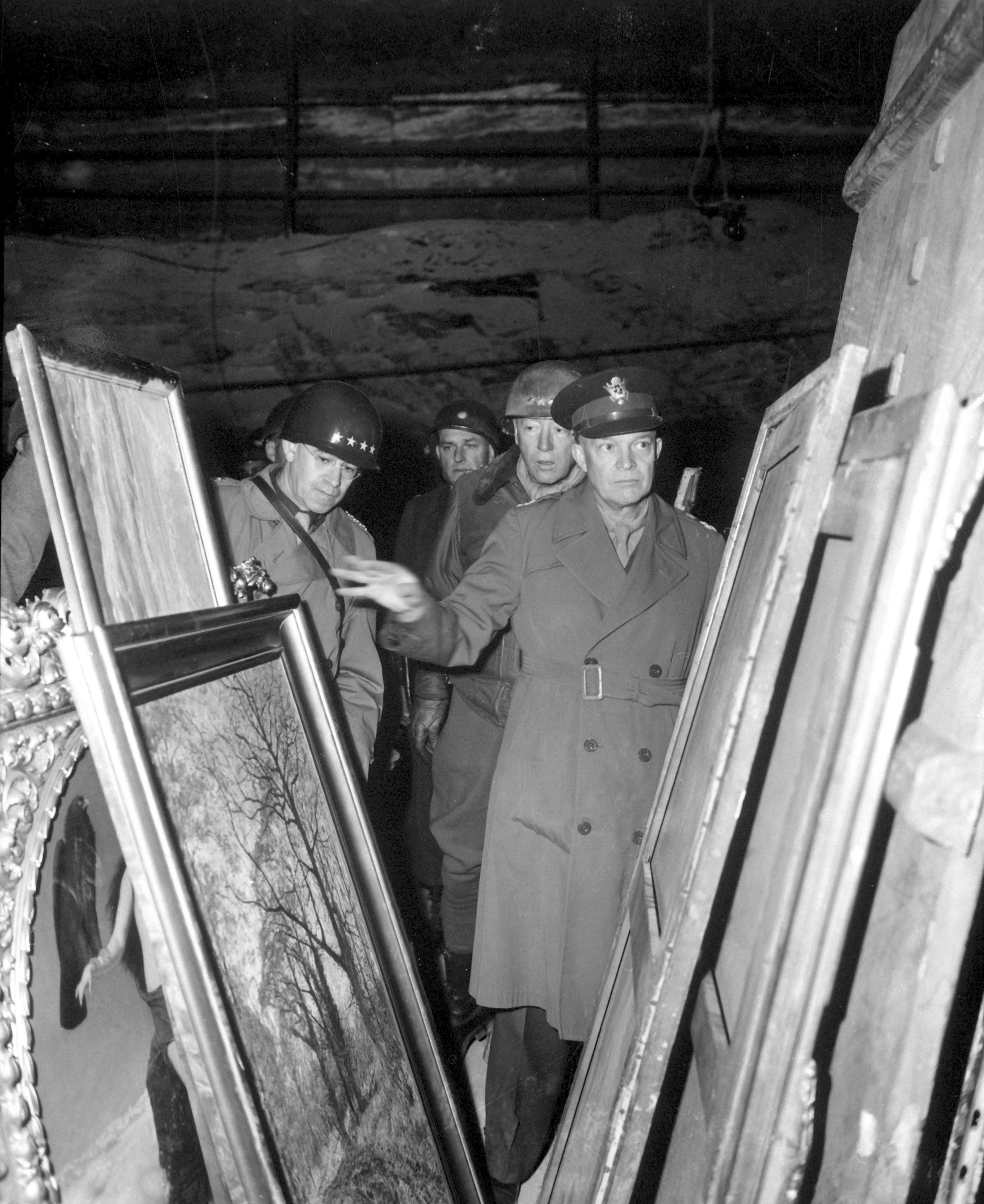
Dwight D. Eisenhower (right) inspects artwork stored in a salt mine in Merkers, accompanied by U.S. Army Generals Omar Bradley (left) and George S. Patton (centre)

Goebels had also edited a 1000-page inventory of French artworks in the occupied zone of France. Count Franz von Wolff-Metternich was responsible for the Kunstschutz in France from 1940 to 1942 and most works in French museums were taken Collections belonging to Jews such as the Rothschilds and the David-Weill family were evacuated using the funds of the French national museums and gathered together in the Musée du Jeu de Paume, where Göring took his pick before putting them all in special trains bound for Berlin. Rose Valland, one of the French curators, took secret notes on the contents of each train out. Ribbentrop, the German foreign minister, tried to get hold of Diana Bathing by François Boucher, whilst Hitler himself took part of Alfred Schloss's collection of 300 Dutch paintings for his personal museum at Linz.

German art looting also occurred in every state invaded and occupied by Germany, but especially Poland, Czechoslovakia, the Soviet Union, the Netherlands, Belgium, Luxembourg and elsewhere.

== See also ==
- Nazi gold
- Nazi loot
- Degenerate art
- Gurlitt Collection
- Reichsleiter Rosenberg Taskforce

== Bibliography ==
- War Land in the Eastern Front. Culture, National Identity, and German Occupation in World War I, Cambridge, Cambridge University Press, 2000.
- Marvin C. Ross, "The Kunstschutz in Occupied France", College Art Journal, Vol. 5, No. 4 (May, 1946), pp. 336–352
- (in French) Maria Starvrinaki, Rapports entre Révolution sociale et révolutions artistiques chez les architectes et peintres allemands sous la République de Weimar.
- (in French) Correspondence collective de la Gläserne Kette, groupe de treize artistes et architectes (Taut, Scharoun, les Luckhardt, Walter Gropius, ...), démontrant la réaction communautariste au lendemain de la Grande Guerre.
- (in German) Ernst Kubin, Raub oder Schutz? Der deutsche militärische Kunstschutz in Italien, Stocker 2001, ISBN 3-7020-0694-X
- (in French) Thèse et livre de Christina Kott en 2002 (en cotutelle avec la FU Berlin) : Protéger, confisquer, déplacer : le service allemand de préservation des œuvres d'art (Kunstschutz) en Belgique et en France occupées pendant la Première Guerre mondiale 1914–1924., Peter Lang 2006 ISBN 90-5201-332-2
- (in French) Antoine Fleury, Le rôle des guerres dans la mémoire des Européens : leur effet sur la conscience d'être européen, Berne, Peter Lang, 1997.
- (in German) Paul Clemen, Kunstschutz im Kriege (Die Kriegsschauplätze in Italien, im Osten und Südosten).
- (in German) Vejas Gabriel Liulevicius, Kriegsland im Osten. Eroberung, Kolonisierung und Militärherrschaft im Ersten Weltkrieg, Hamburg, Hamburg Édition, 2002.
