= Jacques Jaujard =

French museum official (1885–1967)

- Born: Jacques Jaujard; 3 December 1895; Asnières-sur-Seine, Île-de-France
- Died: 21 June 1967 (aged 71); Paris
- Occupation: Director of the French Musées Nationaux
- Spouse: Jeanne Boitel
- Awards: Légion d'honneur; Médaille de la Résistance

Jacques Jaujard (3 December 1895 – 21 June 1967) was a senior civil servant of the French fine art administration instrumental in the evacuation and protection of the French arts collections during World War II.

== Evacuation of the Louvre museum art collection during World War II ==
During the Spanish Civil War in 1938, he supervised the evacuation of the Museo del Prado collections to Switzerland.

Before the German army arrived in Paris, and during the German occupation, and against the orders of the Vichy government, he organized the removal and safe storage, in the provinces (first in the Château de Chambord, then in the Château de Sourches, Château de Saint-Blancard, etc...) of the Louvre art collection, helped by curators Germain Bazin, André Chamson, and René Huyghe.

With the help of Rose Valland, he was instrumental in the saving of the French arts collections during World War II.

Franz von Wolff-Metternich, who was responsible for the conservation of the French art collections under the Kunstschutz principle, from 1940 to 1942, knew what was going on but voluntarily did not do anything. However, in 1942, Wolff-Metternich was recalled from France because he disagreed with the Nazis' looting, and at the end of the war, Jaujard had to hide in Lozère.

== Personal life ==
He met the actress Jeanne Boitel (who was in the resistance under the nickname Mozart) during his resistance activities, and married her later.

== Accolades ==
Jacques Jaujard was awarded the Légion d'honneur and Médaille de la Résistance for his actions during World War II. The main entrance of the École du Louvre is also named after him.

== Bibliography ==
- Françoise Cachin; Collective (1997). "Un très grand directeur : Jacques Jaujard". Pillages et Restitutions: Le Destin des oeuvres d'art sorties de France pendant la Seconde Guerre Mondiale (in French). La Direction. ISBN 978-2-87660-208-3.
- Jean-Pierre Devillers (2015). Illustre et Inconnu. Comment Jacques Jaujard a sauvé le Louvre (Television production). Ladybirds Films.
