= Big Comic Original =

Japanese manga magazine

- Big Comic Original February 5, 2007 issue
- Editor-in-chief: Nakaguma Ichirō
- Categories: Seinen manga
- Frequency: Bi-monthly
- Circulation: 156,333; (July–September 2026)
- Founded: 1972
- Company: Shogakukan
- Country: Japan
- Based in: Tokyo
- Language: Japanese
- Website: Official website

Big Comic Original (Japanese: ビッグコミックオリジナル, Hepburn: Biggu Komikku Orijinaru) is a Japanese seinen manga magazine published by Shogakukan, aimed at an older adult and mostly male audience. It is a sister magazine to the manga magazine Big Comic, the biggest difference being that it goes on sale twice a month in the weeks Big Comic does not. Cover artwork usually features a dog or cat, and a haiku. The dozen or so manga serials running at any given time feature a wide variety of material, from historical dramas and suspense to sports and romance, with relatively little science fiction or fantasy.

Launched in 1972, it has published over 1000 issues, typically running to about 350 pages in a black-and-white, saddle-stapled format, selling for 340 yen (2015). More than 83% of readers are reported to be over 30 years old, with female readers comprising about a quarter of the total. Most readers are company employees. Circulation in 2015 was reported at 539,500.

== Currently running manga series ==
Title	Author/Artist	Premiered
Bara-mura e Yōkoso (薔薇村へようこそ)	Fumi Saimon	October 2021
Bokura wa Sore o Koete Yuku (僕らはそれを越えてゆく)	Yū Nakahara	September 2021
Cecil no Joō (セシルの女王, Seshiru no Joō)	Hideo Iura	October 2021
Curry Man (カレーマン, Karēman)	Mitsuo Hashimoto (original work by Masaru Miyazaki)	July 2022
Dekake Oya (出かけ親)	Sensha Yoshida	July 2017
Himiko (卑弥呼)	Richard Wu (story) and Mariko Nakamura (art)	September 2018
Hon no Mushi Mimizuku-kun (本の虫 ミミズクくん)	Yuniko Karashi	September 2021
Kango Joshu no Nana-chan (看護助手のナナちゃん)	Chisa Nomura	August 2010 (Note: The manga started in Big Comic Original Zōkan in April 2009, and has been parallel published in the main magazine since August 2010.)
Like Shooting Stars in the Twilight (黄昏流星群, Tasogare Ryūseigun)	Kenshi Hirokane	1995
Miwa-san Narisumasu (ミワさんなりすます)	Uhei Aoki	January 2021
No Comic, No Life (没有漫画 没有人生, Nō Komikku nō Raifu)	Minetarō Mochizuki	January 2022
San-Chōme no Yūhi Yūyake no Uta	Ryohei Saigan	September 1974
Shōwa Tennō Monogatari (昭和天皇物語)	Kazutoshi Hando (story), Issei Eifuku (story) and Junichi Nojo (art)	April 2017
Shin'ya Shokudō (深夜食堂)	Yaro Abe	August 2007 (Note: The manga started in Big Comic Original Zōkan in October 2006, and was transferred to the main magazine in August 2007.)
Stigma (スティグマ, Sutiguma)	Hideo Iura	March 2021
Ta-tan (たーたん)	Keiko Nishi	January 2015
Tetsubon (テツぼん)	Kiyoshi Nagamatsu (story) and Enshu Takahashi (art)	January 2011
Tsuribaka Nisshi (釣りバカ日誌)	Juzo Yamasaki (story) and Kenichi Kitami (art)	1979
Zenkamono (前科者)	Masahito Kagawa (story) and Toji Tsukishima (art)	December 2017

== Manga artists and series published ==
- Mitsuru Adachi
  - Jinbē (1992–1997) and Bōken Shōnen (1998–2005)
- George Akiyama
  - Haguregumo (1973–2017)
- Nobuyuki Fukumoto
  - The Legend of the Strongest, Kurosawa! (2002–2006)
  - Shin Kurosawa:Saikyō Densetsu (2013–2020)
- Mitsuo Hashimoto
  - Station (1992–1996)
- Kenshi Hirokane and Masao Yajima
  - Human Crossing (1980–1990)
- Shinichi Ishizuka
  - Gaku: Minna no Yama (2003–2012)
- Hideo Iura
  - Bengoshi no Kuzu (2003–2009)
- Ichimaru
  - Okami-san (1990–1999)
  - Okami-san Heisei Basho (2011–2013)
- Junji Ito
  - No Longer Human (2017–2018)
- Eiji Kazama
  - Kaze no Daichi (風の大地) (1990–2022; with Nobuhiro Sakata)
- Kō Kojima
  - Hige to Boin (1974–2004)
- Shinji Mizushima
  - Abu-san (1973–2014)
- Motoka Murakami
  - Ryuu Ron (1991–2006)
- Jiro Taniguchi
  - Guardians of the Louvre (2014)
- Naoki Urasawa
  - Pineapple Army (1985–1988; with Kazuya Kudo)
  - Master Keaton (1988–1994; with Hokusei Katsushika and Takashi Nagasaki)
  - Monster (1994–2001)
  - Pluto (2003–2009)
  - Master Keaton Remaster (2012–2014; with Takashi Nagasaki)
  - Mujirushi: The Sign of Dreams (2017–2018)
- Takatoshi Yamada
  - Dr. Kotō Shinryōjo (moved from Weekly Young Sunday; 2008–2010) [on hiatus]
- Osamu Yamamoto
  - Akagari: The Red Rat in Hollywood (2017–2021)
