= Girl Late for School with Toast in Her Mouth =

Anime and manga trope

Girl Late for School with Toast in Her Mouth (遅刻する食パン少女 Chikoku suru shokupan shōjo) is a trope in Japanese shōjo manga (girls' comics) for a schoolgirl to rush into her morning class with a slice of toasted white bread in her mouth, and collide with a boy with whom she eventually falls in love. It is also known by alternative names such as Shokupan Dash (食パンダッシュ), Toast Musume (トースト娘, "Toast Girl"), Toast Kuwaete Chikoku Chikoku (トーストくわえて遅刻遅刻, "Holding Toast, Late Late"), and Pan Kuwae Dash (パンくわえダッシュ, "Bread-in-Mouth Dash").

== Outline ==
The general storyline is as follows: The protagonist, a junior high or high school girl, is running late for school one morning. Too pressed for time to eat breakfast properly, she dashes out of the house with a slice of bread (toast) in her mouth. Hurriedly shouting, 「いっけなーい遅刻遅刻!」 ("Ikkēnāi Chikoku Chikoku!", "Oh no, I'm late, I'm late!"), she runs along her school route. At a street corner, she collides with a boy. They might exchange insults or apologies.

When the girl arrives at school, the same boy appears in her classroom as a transfer student. He ends up sitting next to her, often because it's "coincidentally the only empty seat". Due to the earlier collision, the girl initially dislikes the boy. However, after various twists and turns, the two eventually fall in love. (Note: Confectionery researcher Rika Fukuda, in her book Gorotsuki wa Itsumo Shokutaku o Osou, stated that when introducing this general storyline, she wrote it purely from memory without referencing any specific manga.)

In some variations, the "encounter" scene is omitted, and the trope consists only of the girl running late with bread in her mouth.

== Origin ==
An early instance of a character running out of the house with bread in their mouth appears in a 1962 installment of the manga version of Sazae-san, where the character Wakame Isono does this. This is considered the oldest known example of the "running out with bread in mouth" element. Additionally, in the 1970s manga Glass Mask, the protagonist Maya Kitajima has a scene where she runs to school with bread in her mouth.

In 1990, the 9th chapter of Saru demo Kakeru Manga Kyōshitsu (Even Monkeys Can Draw Manga; hereafter Saruman) by Kōji Aihara and Kentarō Takekuma, depicted the full scenario described above as a typical encounter scene in shōjo manga. A 2010 Goo Ranking poll titled "Situations in Old Shōjo Manga That Make You Think 'That Happens!'" ranked this scene third, reinforcing its perception as a classic trope. Confectionery researcher Rika Fukuda, known for her expertise in shōjo manga and subculture from the 1960s onwards, described the trope in her 2012 book Gorotsuki wa Itsumo Shokutaku o Osou, stating she wrote it "from memory alone, without looking at anything specific", treating it as a common scenario. Internationally, a 2013 BuzzFeed article listed it among scenes frequently observed in Japanese anime by foreign viewers.

However, researchers including Rika Fukuda, freelance writer Wakako Takō, (Note: Wakako Takō (田幸 和歌子 Takō Wakako, born 1973 in Nagano Prefecture) worked at an advertising production company before becoming a freelance writer.) and illustrator Haioku have pointed out that examples matching the full storyline described above are almost nonexistent in older shōjo manga.

In a 2005 Excite News article, Wakako Takō reported investigating 85 shōjo manga titles. She found only five, such as Nagatachō Strawberry, where a character explicitly says "I'm late, I'm late!", and only four, like Iruka-chan Yoroshiku, where either the protagonist or the love interest is a transfer student. No manga fulfilled all four elements: "toast", "late", "collision", and "romance". Following up on Takō's article, Haioku stated that based on having read every issue of the manga magazine Ribon from 1970 to 1985, no such manga existed, concluding it could not be called a standard scene. The aforementioned Goo Ranking also noted the lack of actual examples in older manga. Rika Fukuda, writing in a 2012 bakery-themed issue of the magazine Kettle and in her book Gorotsuki wa Itsumo Shokutaku o Osou published the same year, reported that after investigating 1960s–1970s romantic comedy shōjo manga, shōjo novels, and contemporary rom-com shōnen manga, she found instances of individual elements like "running to school", "colliding with someone", and "falling in love with a transfer student", but no work matched the complete plot outline. Consultations with fellow manga enthusiasts also failed to identify a specific example.

Fukuda identifies the earliest appearance of the full scene depiction as the aforementioned 9th chapter of Saruman. However, that chapter specifically introduces the sequence as a parody of typical shōjo manga elements to demonstrate how to draw them. This implies the parody appeared before any verifiable original. The book Banana no Kawa wa Naze Suberu no ka? (Why Are Banana Peels Slippery?; Suiseisha, 2010) also speculates that Saruman was the first work to focus on this scene. When Haioku emailed Kentarō Takekuma about Saruman, Takekuma replied that there was "no direct source material, it was a composite of several examples" and that "by the time Takekuma was in junior high (mid-1970s), the general recognition that this was a kind of pattern already existed."

Meanwhile, in television anime, the final episode of Neon Genesis Evangelion (aired March 27, 1996) featured a similar scene in an alternate reality (parodying slice of life anime) involving the main characters Shinji Ikari and Rei Ayanami. (Note: However, this scene reverses the pattern, with Rei Ayanami (a female character) holding the toast being the transfer student. Furthermore, it is presented as part of Shinji Ikari's alternate reality fantasy, unrelated to the main plot of Evangelion.) Fukuda argues that this depiction of the popular character Rei Ayanami as a "toast girl" in the culturally impactful anime Evangelion definitively cemented the "girl late for school with toast" trope in the public consciousness. Fukuda also suggests this represents a kind of collective memory, an experience shared without a definite origin or real substance.

Later, in 2015, designer Hiroshi Hōtō initiated an investigation on Twitter into the scene's origins. This discussion brought up examples like a scene in Harris no Kaze where a character rushes out of the house with an onigiri (rice ball) in their mouth, and a scene in Fuji Santarō featuring bread. Haioku, having reviewed thousands of manga from the late 1960s and 1970s, confirmed the lack of "bread in mouth" scenes but pointed to Tsurai ze! Bokuchan (a 1970s shōjo manga) which featured a schoolgirl running late and colliding with a boy. Editor Nobunaga Shinbo also reported a similar collision scene in 1 & 2 Sandrō via Twitter.

Thus, a possible explanation is that the separate scenes of "running late with bread in mouth" and "running late, colliding with a boy at a corner" became conflated over time. Saruman then solidified this combined image by linking it specifically to shōjo manga. Since there was little basis or motivation to refute this portrayal, the "girl late for school with toast" trope became accepted as a common shōjo manga cliché, a perception that persisted. Some have also suggested that the availability of thinly sliced bread (like 8-slice loaves), which are easier to hold in the mouth, contributed to the feasibility of the "bread in mouth" element.

Since the 2010s, the trope has become so standard that it is often used for comedic effect. The 2017 episode #1096 of the anime Chibi Maruko-chan references it as a typical shōjo manga trope, with Maruko wondering if running to school with toast in her mouth would lead to a fateful encounter like in a girls' comic.

The trope is recognized internationally. In Russia, where Japanese manga and anime are popular, one woman who grew up watching anime stated that the scene left such an impression she thought it was a common occurrence in daily Japanese life.

Focusing solely on the "running with bread in mouth" aspect, a survey by the "Toast Research Institute" (トースト総合研究所) found that 4.2% of respondents had actually done it, and 6.4% had witnessed it, suggesting around 10% of Japanese people have experienced this scene in reality, not just in fiction. Research by the internet survey company DIMSDRIVE found that 10.1% of people had left home with bread in their mouth when running late, and 11.4% said they "would like to try it".

A similar situation where a story type appears to be an homage or parody but lacks a true original source is the "villainess" trope within the Narōkei genre (often associated with isekai). This pattern involves reincarnation into the rival character of an otome game, but it does not typically derive from characters in actual existing otome games.

== Related cultural phenomena ==
- In 2011, as part of a class project for the Graphic Design course in the Visual Design Department at Kyoto Seika University, the "Shokupan Dash!!" activity was launched. This group of four female students (then sophomores) created a main character named "Shokupan Shōjo Yamada-chan" based on the trope. They aimed to foster communication between consumers and producers through bread, using Twitter updates and publishing a free paper (until August 2016, later transitioning to a website). Yamada-chan is canonically described as dashing to school with toast every day, dreaming of "colliding with her boyfriend at the corner". The Twitter account, reportedly run by a real person who modeled for Yamada-chan, gained over 1200 followers soon after its launch in 2011.
- In 2014, game developer HAP Inc. released a free mobile game titled "Toast Girl" (トースト少女) based on the trope, which gained popularity online. The developer claimed the idea came after working late, then running late the next morning with toast in his mouth, seeing his reflection in a shop window. Users praised the game's music quality and simple yet detailed fun, achieving 200,000 downloads by March 2015.
- In 2017, the official Twitter accounts of Imuraya Group, known for its canned yude azuki (sweet red beans), and Pasco, a brand of Shikishima Baking, posted a collaborative tweet parodying the trope. Instead of a girl, Pasco's bread itself ran down the street and collided with Imuraya's canned azuki, resulting not in love, but in Ogura toast. The heartwarming exchange became a topic online.
  External image
  - Advertisement visual from Shikishima Baking: "Even bread has to run." – Yomiuri Shimbun
- Shikishima Baking (Pasco) followed up in 2018 with a full-page advertisement in the national edition of the Yomiuri Shimbun. It featured an illustration of Nanami Minami, a character from the light novel series Bottom-tier Character Tomozaki, running in her school uniform with bread in her mouth, accompanied by the copy 「パンだって、走らなくちゃ。」 ("Pan datte, hashiranakucha.", "Even bread has to run."). The ad quickly spread on social media like Twitter. According to Yomiuri Shimbun's "Yomi Buzz" Twitter analysis, it generated 2,985 tweets (including retweets) within two days, reaching an estimated 4.19 million people. The Yomiuri Shimbun Marketing Department stated that during the ad's creation, they considered the scene of a schoolgirl running with toast to be a classic, standard trope in manga, making it the most appealing concept. The advertisement won an Excellence Award at the 35th Yomiuri Advertising Awards in 2018.
- Focusing only on the "running with toast" element, a 2015 promotional video for the smartphone game Gekitotsu! Break Gakuen titled "Spring Late Arrival Prevention Campaign: Shokupan Shōjo Matsuri" (食パン少女祭り, Toast Girl Festival) featured an animation of girls running with toast. The accompanying press release noted the common image of late high school girls dashing out of the house with bread in their mouths.
- Attempts have been made to recreate the scene in live action. In 2009, the street performance group "Sapporo Happening" in Sapporo, Hokkaido, organized a "Shokupan Dash" as part of their activities involving harmless pranks. On the morning of April 16, over 30 volunteers (students and working adults) actually rushed to school or work with toast in their mouths. Onlookers reacted with surprise and attention, and online comments included remarks like "wonderful" and "looks fun".
  External image
  - Poster for the photo exhibition "Shokupan Shōjo" – gigantea room
- In 2010, Yuki Maeda, editor-in-chief of Osaka-based magazine Monthly Simulation, collaborated with photographer Chihiro Kihara (who shot the magazine's covers) on a photo exhibition titled "Shokupan Shōjo". Held at the "gigantea room" gallery in Osaka's Amerikamura, it featured morning street scenes. While it garnered attention on news sites, the reaction from actual viewers was reportedly underwhelming. Maeda speculated this was because the charm diminishes in live action, or perhaps because running while eating is considered impolite.
- On January 17, 2022, Niigata Prefecture launched the "Chikoku Suru Omusubi Shōjo Project" (遅刻するおむすび少女プロジェクト, "Girl Late for School with Onigiri Project"). Videos were posted to the Niigata Rice PR YouTube channel on January 24. The prefecture explained the initiative was based on the idea that the pervasive image of the "girl late with toast" trope might be contributing to a decline in rice consumption for breakfast among Japanese people. Their solution was to create a new image: the "girl late with onigiri". (However, as previously mentioned, Harris no Kaze already depicted a character running with an onigiri.) Niigata Prefecture stated they specifically used the term "omusubi" (rather than the similar "onigiri") because the project launched on January 17, known as "Omusubi Day" in Japan, and to invoke wordplay related to "musubi" (tying/connecting), like "tying a connection with one's desired school". The prefecture clarified the project's aim was to use this imagery to encourage eating rice for breakfast, not to endorse running with food. Online reactions were mixed, with some agreeing with the "rice for breakfast" sentiment or finding the project amusing, while others noted the lack of time to make onigiri in the morning or questioned the use of taxpayer money.

== See also ==
- Mandela effect – Phenomenon of shared false memories, relevant to the trope's perceived prevalence despite lack of examples
- Katsudon – Specifically, the trope of katsudon being served during police interrogations in Japanese fiction, another widely recognized but often inaccurate staple
- Running gag
- Meet cute

== Bibliography ==
- Aihara, Kōji; Takekuma, Kentarō (2 January 1990). "Saru demo Kakeru Manga Kyōshitsu" [Even Monkeys Can Draw Manga]. Big Comic Spirits (in Japanese). 11 (1). Shogakukan. NCID AA12675713.
- Kuroki, Natsumi (30 April 2010). バナナの皮はなぜすべるのか? [Why Are Banana Peels Slippery?] (in Japanese). Suiseisha. ISBN 978-4-89176-777-8.
- Hashimoto, Noriko (2 November 2012). ポスト・ブック・レビュー [Post Book Review]. Weekly Post (in Japanese). 44 (28). Shogakukan. NCID AN1045581X.
- Fukuda, Rika (23 April 2012). ゴロツキはいつも食卓を襲う フード理論とステレオタイプフード50 [Gorotsuki Always Attack the Dinner Table: Food Theory and 50 Stereotypical Foods] (in Japanese). Ohta Publishing. ISBN 978-4-7783-1313-5.
- Shibasaki, Tomoka (22 September 2010). よそ見津々 [Looking Aside Intently] (in Japanese). Nihon Keizai Shimbun Shuppansha. ISBN 978-4-532-16755-4.
