= Ichi the Killer (manga) =

Japanese manga series

- First tankōbon volume cover

殺し屋1 (Koroshiya Ichi)
- Genre: Action; Psychological thriller; Yakuza
- Manga

Ichi
- Written by: Hideo Yamamoto
- Published by: Shogakukan
- English publisher: NA: Seven Seas Entertainment
- Magazine: Weekly Young Sunday
- Published: 1993
- Volumes: 1
- Manga
- Written by: Hideo Yamamoto
- Published by: Shogakukan
- English publisher: NA: Seven Seas Entertainment
- Magazine: Weekly Young Sunday
- Original run: 1998 – 2001
- Volumes: 10
- Original video animation

Ichi the Killer: Episode 0
- Directed by: Shinji Ishihira
- Produced by: Yoshinori Chiba
- Written by: Sakichi Sato
- Music by: Yui Takase
- Studio: AIC
- Licensed by: AUS: Siren Visual
- Released: September 27, 2002
- Runtime: 50 minutes
- Live action films
- Ichi the Killer (2001); 1-Ichi (2003)
- icon

Ichi the Killer (Japanese: 殺し屋1, Hepburn: Koroshiya Ichi) is a Japanese manga series written and illustrated by Hideo Yamamoto. A first series, titled Ichi, was serialized in Shogakukan's seinen manga magazine Weekly Young Sunday in 1993; Ichi the Killer was serialized in the same magazine from 1998 to 2001, with its chapters collected in ten tankōbon volumes. The series revolves around Ichi, a psychologically troubled killing machine, and his confrontation with the yakuza of Kabukichō, Shinjuku.

In 2001, the manga was adapted into a live-action film directed by Takashi Miike. A second live-action film, 1-Ichi, directed by Masahito Tanno, was released in Japan in 2003. A prequel original video animation (OVA), titled Ichi the Killer: Episode 0, animated by AIC, was released in Japan in 2002. The OVA was licensed in North America by Central Park Media and in Australia and New Zealand by Siren Visual.

== Plot ==
Using Ichi as a tool, the "Old Geezer" plots to kill the Anjo yakuza family leader, Yoshio Anjo, and steal his money. With Anjo's death, his top yakuza, Masao Kakihara, sets out to find his leader's murderer; Kakihara searches for Ichi, while the younger man effortlessly kills off the remaining Anjo family members. This cycle of killing and searching leads the two closer together, revealing Ichi's psychological manipulation and Kakihara's obsession of pain and torture. When the two finally meet, they confront their deepest and most suppressed desires, resulting in Ichi's recovery and Kakihara's demise.

== Characters ==
Hajime Shiroishi (城石 一, Shiroishi Hajime; extra2/) Ichi (イチ)
A psychologically and emotionally disturbed young man, to the point where he acts as a child living in an adult's body. When faced with a confrontation, Ichi bursts into tears and breaks down emotionally. Even with his cowardly personality, Ichi has trained extensively in martial arts. With this training, a concealed blade in his left boot, and a psychological kill switch, Ichi turns into a ruthless killer; hunting down yakuza with a streak for sadism.
Masao Kakihara (垣原 雅雄, Kakihara Masao)
A yakuza boss and Ichi's archenemy. He is tired of everything in life and lives to inflict pain, both on those around him as well as himself. His most notable characteristics are the deep gashes on his cheeks which allow him to open his mouth to ridiculous levels, akin to that of a snake, and which are subsequently held together by piercings. He lives his life for sadomasochism.
Old Geezer (ジジイ, Jijī)
His real name is unknown. The mastermind behind the unrest in the Anjo family, as well as the puppet master forcing Ichi to kill. He claims to have gained his aged features through plastic surgery and to still be in his early 30's. He has an extremely muscular physique due to abusing steroids.
Yoshio Anjo (安生 芳雄, Anjō Yoshio)
The head of the Anjo family. His murder, which is first disguised as a disappearance, leads Kakihara to search for Ichi.
Noboru (昇)
A member of the Old Geezer's group whose primary weapons are firearms.
Inoue (井上, extra2/) Kano (加納, Kanō)
An excommunicated member of the Anjo family and a current member of the Old Geezer's group, Inoue is also a heroin addict that has undergone plastic surgery to remain hidden in Shinjuku.
Suzuki (鈴木)
A member of the Funaki yakuza family. He is accused of kidnapping Anjo family's leader. He is bedridden by the resulting torture and is convinced by the Old Geezer's group to employ them to eliminate Kakihara.
Shuji Kaneko (金子 修二, Kaneko Shūji)
Anjo family's hitman and one of Kakihara's closest henchmen. He exhibits a fear similar to Ichi's and desires to prove himself. He is also Takeshi's father.
Karen (カレン)
A hostess and one of Kakihara's friends. She assists Kakihara in locating members of the Old Geezer's group. She is eventually revealed to be assisting the Old Geezer and is eventually killed by Ichi as his last target.
Tachibana (立花)
A girl from Ichi's first year in high school. When trying to save Ichi from bullies, she was ostracized and raped.
Jiro (二郎, Jirō) and Saburo (三郎, Saburō)
Twin brothers and former members of the Ato yakuza family, recruited by Kakihara, who was also a member of the Ato family. The twins as competitive as they are sadistic, often resulting in shows of one-upmanship fatal to others. Jiro has inhuman strength, while Saburo is good with a short knife.
Takeshi Kaneko (金子 タケシ, Kaneko Takeshi)
Shuji's son. He witnesses Ichi crying after his murders. He is also Ichi's successor as the next "killing machine" manipulated by the Old Geezer.

== Media ==
=== Manga ===
Written and illustrated Hideo Yamamoto, Ichi the Killer was preceded by a short series, titled Ichi (イチ), which was published in Shogakukan's seinen manga magazine Weekly Young Sunday in 1993, and its chapters were collected in a single tankōbon volume, released on August 5, 1993. Ichi the Killer was serialized in the same magazine from 1998 to 2001. Shogakukan collected its chapters in ten tankōbon volumes, released from June 5, 1998, to July 5, 2001. Shogakukan republished the series in five bunkoban volumes, released from April 14 to August 11, 2007. A five-volume shinsōban edition was released by Shogakukan between February 27 and June 30, 2015.

In August 2024, Seven Seas Entertainment announced that it had licensed the series. The publisher released it in a five-volume omnibus edition from July 29, 2025, to November 17, 2026. A "Volume 0" is set to release on December 29, 2026.

=== Live action films ===
A live action film adaptation, directed by Takashi Miike, premiered in Japan on December 22, 2001. A direct-to-video live action prequel film, titled 1-Ichi, directed by Masato Tanno, was released on January 24, 2003.

=== Original video animation ===
A prequel original video animation (OVA) by AIC, titled Ichi the Killer: Episode 0 (殺し屋1 The Animation Episode 0, Koroshiya Ichi Za Animēshon Episōdo Zero), was released on VHS and DVD on September 27, 2002.

In North America, the OVA was licensed by Central Park Media and released on DVD on September 21, 2004. It was licensed in Australia and New Zealand by Siren Visual and released on February 21, 2005.

== Reception ==
Tomo Machiyama of Pulp listed the series among the "Most Hellish (Untranslated) Manga....ever!!!" due to its extreme violence and disturbing content. He observed that while the manga had been banned in some prefectures, it offered a profound existentialist commentary on the nature of existence within a peaceful consumerist society. Machiyama noted its creator, known for Voyeurs, Inc., crafted a narrative that questioned how individuals affirm their own vitality.

Chris Beveridge of AnimeOnDVD described the OVA as an exploration of psychological responses to violence, pressure, and sexuality. While the excessive brutality avoided the dark comedy of Natural Born Killers, it remained unsettling in its execution. Beveridge emphasized its unapologetically graphic nature. Bamboo Dong of Anime News Network criticized the OVA as an exercise in gratuitous sex and violence, arguing that its psychological potential was overshadowed by a preoccupation with visceral thrills. Theron Martin, also writing for Anime News Network, found the narrative plausible in its depiction of a killer's origins, though he criticized the subpar animation. He praised the soundtrack's aggressive techno score for enhancing the OVA's tense atmosphere.

Mike Toole of Anime Jump likened the OVA's crude, unsettling art style to the doodles of a disturbed adolescent, yet deemed it an intentional reflection of the story's brutality. He compared its unsubtle approach to the works of David Cronenberg or Brian De Palma, recommending it primarily for fans of director Takashi Miike or the original Ichi the Killer. Chris Feldman of Animation World Network praised the OVA's self-contained storytelling, noting it required little prior knowledge of the franchise. He remarked that its extreme content would never air uncensored on American television, even on Adult Swim, but considered it essential viewing for existing fans.
