= Scott Pilgrim =

Canadian series of graphic novels

- Scott Pilgrim, Vol. 1 coloured edition cover by Bryan Lee O'Malley and Nathan Fairbairn, featuring the titular character Scott Pilgrim

Publication information
- Publisher: Oni Press (United States); Fourth Estate (United Kingdom)
- Format: Digest limited series
- Genre: Magic realism Action; Fantasy; Slice of life Romantic comedy Surreal comedy Dramedy
- Publication date: Original versions: August 18, 2004 – July 20, 2010; Colour versions: August 8, 2012 - May 5, 2015
- Main characters: List of characters

Creative team
- Written by: Bryan Lee O'Malley
- Artist: Bryan Lee O'Malley

Collected editions
- Scott Pilgrim's Precious Little Life: ISBN 1-932664-08-4
- Scott Pilgrim vs. The World: ISBN 1-932664-12-2
- Scott Pilgrim & The Infinite Sadness: ISBN 1-932664-22-X
- Scott Pilgrim Gets It Together: ISBN 1-932664-49-1
- Scott Pilgrim vs. The Universe: ISBN 1-934964-10-7
- Scott Pilgrim's Finest Hour: ISBN 1-934964-38-7

Scott Pilgrim is a series of graphic novels written and illustrated by Canadian author and comic book artist Bryan Lee O'Malley. The original edition of the series consists of six digest size black-and-white volumes, released between August 2004 and July 2010, by Portland-based independent comic book publisher Oni Press. It was later republished by Fourth Estate, an imprint of HarperCollins. Full-colour hardback volumes, coloured by Nathan Fairbairn, were released from August 2012 to May 2015.

The series revolves around the titular Scott Pilgrim, a slacker and part-time musician who lives in Toronto and plays bass ‍in a rock band, as he dates a high school student after a traumatic breakup. He simultaneously starts a tentative romance with American delivery girl Ramona Flowers, soon discovering she has seven evil exes. They are manipulated into targeting Scott in combat by her most recent ex-boyfriend, Gideon Graves, forcing both Scott and Ramona to come to terms with their respective pasts, relationships, and behaviors.

The Scott Pilgrim series received widespread acclaim from critics for its artwork, humor, themes, characters, influences, storyline and visual style, and it has garnered a significant cult following. A film adaptation of the series titled Scott Pilgrim vs. the World, directed by Edgar Wright, was released in August 2010. A video game adaptation, Scott Pilgrim vs. the World: The Game, developed by Ubisoft for the PlayStation 3 and Xbox 360, was released the same month. An animated series adaptation titled Scott Pilgrim Takes Off was released on Netflix in November 2023, with the cast of the 2010 film reprising their roles, O'Malley writing the script, and Wright serving as an executive producer. A second video game titled Scott Pilgrim EX was released in March 2026.

== Publications ==
The main graphic novel series is:

| # | Title | ISBN | Release date | Notes |
|---|---|---|---|---|
| 1 | Scott Pilgrim's Precious Little Life | 978-1-932664-08-9 (original); 978-1-62010-000-4 (colour hardcover) | August 18, 2004 (original); August 8, 2012 (colour hardcover) | |
| 2 | Scott Pilgrim vs. The World | 978-1-932664-12-6 (original); 978-1-62010-001-1 (colour hardcover) | June 15, 2005 (original); November 7, 2012 (colour hardcover) | |
| 3 | Scott Pilgrim & The Infinite Sadness | 978-1-932664-22-5 (original); 978-1-62010-002-8 (colour hardcover) | May 24, 2006 (original); May 22, 2013 (colour hardcover) | |
| 4 | Scott Pilgrim Gets It Together | 978-1-932664-49-2 (original); 978-1-620100-03-5 (colour hardcover) | November 14, 2007 (original); November 13, 2013 (colour hardcover) | The format of the series' spine art is changed (original Oni Press print). |
| 5 | Scott Pilgrim vs. The Universe | 978-1-934964-10-1 (original); 978-1-620100-04-2 (colour hardcover) | February 4, 2009 (original); August 13, 2014 (colour hardcover) | The first printing of Volume 5 features a shiny cover. |
| 6 | Scott Pilgrim's Finest Hour | 978-1-934964-38-5 (original); 978-1-620100-05-9 (colour hardcover) | July 20, 2010 (original); May 5, 2015 (colour hardcover) | |

Other appearances

- Comics Festival (40-page anthology including a one-page Scott Pilgrim comic; released on Free Comic Book Day 2005)
- PENG (72-page one-shot comic book by Corey Lewis where Scott Pilgrim appears in one panel; released in 2005)
- Free Scott Pilgrim No. 1 FCBD 2006 Edition (32-page comic book featuring a 17-page original Scott Pilgrim story; released on Free Comic Book Day 2006) This story is available for free online at the Scott Pilgrim Website
- Comics Festival 2007! (40-page anthology including a half-page Scott Pilgrim comic and a 4-page Wonderful World of Kim Pine comic; released on Free Comic Book Day 2007)
- Scott Pilgrim: Full Colour Odds & Ends 2008 (collects Free Scott Pilgrim #1 – newly coloured by Dean Trippe, Wonderful World of Kim Pine four-page story, Now Magazine Best of Toronto two-page strip in black-and-white, the Comics Fest 07 sushi strip, and various watercolours, pin-ups, and advertisements)
- Scott Pilgrim Print Collection 2004-2024 was released September 24, 2024 and will contained 21 prints by Bryan Lee O'Malley including never-before-seen art.

All of these ancillary stories are available to read on the Scott Pilgrim Website. A collector's box containing all six volumes and a fold-in poster was released in North America on November 3, 2010.

Scott Pilgrim's Precious Little Life was re-released in colour in August 2012, with the others being released on an irregular schedule, the last in May 2015. In addition to all of the ancillary strips, the hardcover colour editions contain bonus content such as original sketches, creator notes, promotional material, and deleted scenes.

The entire series was re-released in colour again in July 2019 as the Scott Pilgrim Color Collection, collected into 3 larger-format paperback volumes. These three books were released individually and as a box set.

The series was re-released again in both black-and-white and colour in August 2024 for the twentieth anniversary, with the extras from the colour versions being combined into one book: Scott Pilgrim Collected Extras along with other physical items.

== Development ==
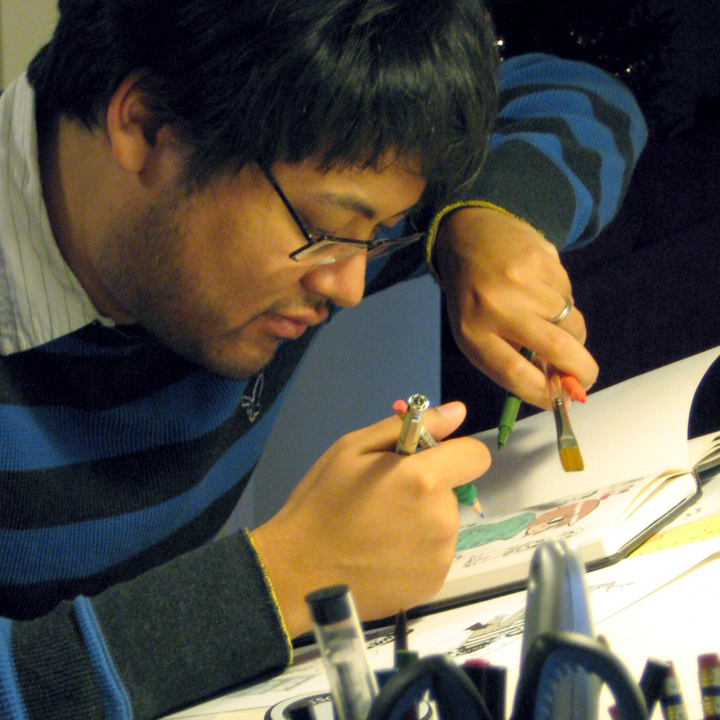
Bryan Lee O'Malley, 2008

Creator Bryan Lee O'Malley was inspired to create the series and eponymous character of Scott Pilgrim after listening to Canadian band Plumtree's 1998 single "Scott Pilgrim", a song then-Plumtree singer Carla Gillis describes as "positive, but ... also bittersweet." In particular, O'Malley was inspired by the lyric, "I've liked you for a thousand years."

O'Malley wanted to write a shōnen-style comic book series, although he had only read one such series at the time, Ranma ½; in the early 2000s, Japanese manga had not yet achieved significant popularity in North America. O'Malley gained inspiration from the book Even a Monkey Can Draw Manga by Koji Aihara and Kentaro Takekuma. In 2002, O'Malley's roommate, who worked in a comic book store, brought the book to him while O'Malley was working on Lost at Sea and was planning Scott Pilgrim. Upon reading the book O'Malley realized that, despite the satirical tone, it could be an effective guide to how the Japanese comic book industry worked. O'Malley said that Ranma ½ was the strongest influence and Atsuko Nakajima, the character designer of the Ranma ½ anime and other anime, was an influence to a lesser extent. He added that the "exploded page layouts" of Koudelka, a work by Yuji Iwahara, directly influenced the "full-bleed layouts" of Scott Pilgrim. O'Malley said that Osamu Tezuka began influencing his work as he created Volumes 3 and 4. He said, "You can see his influence start to creep in here and there but he's a larger inspirational figure to me than just his drawing style." In regards to the FLCL anime, O'Malley said that while it was an influence, it was "not as much of a direct influence on Scott Pilgrim as people seem to think."

O'Malley used black and white because it was less expensive than creating the series in colour, and so O'Malley said that he "embraced the B&W manga aesthetic". When writing the series, O'Malley's first step was developing the direction of the story by creating notes in notebooks, sketchbooks, and computer text files. His second step was to create an outline. His third step was to write a script. His fourth step was to develop thumbnails. His final step was to develop the finished comic book page. To ink, O'Malley usually used brushes, including No. 2 and No. 3 brushes. He mostly used computers to build the screentone; he stated that he encountered difficulty finding screentone in North America. O'Malley himself created most of the Scott Pilgrim material. When production on Volume 6 had begun, O'Malley had hired two assistants. The backgrounds in Volume 6 are more detailed than the backgrounds in the previous volumes (O'Malley said that "[m]ost fans don't seem to notice the change").

O'Malley stated that he wanted to create a "hybrid" work that received inspiration from American and Japanese comics, and that he "wanted to reach towards the Japanese comics from my own starting point." When asked if he considers Scott Pilgrim to be a manga, O'Malley responded by saying "Um... No, I think I was just thinking about that today. I guess I was just thinking about the whole OEL thing. I think it's influenced... I like the term 'manga-influenced comics,' but I only like it because no one else likes it."

O'Malley said that he expected Scott Pilgrim to sell around 1,000 copies. He did not expect the series to sell millions of copies and to produce a film adaptation. O'Malley cited the United States comics industry and how it differs from the Japanese comics industry; the United States comic book companies specialize in superhero comics and many newer concepts originate from underground comics. The United States also lacks weekly and monthly comic book magazines and American comic companies generally do not have the system of story editors and assistants that Japanese comic companies have.

O'Malley said that the most difficult portion of Scott Pilgrim to write was the ending. O'Malley deliberately did not consider constructing the ending until he began writing Volume 5. He intended for Volumes 5 and 6 to reflect one single story, with 5 being the "darkest hour" and 6 being the "redemption arc". O'Malley said "there was a lot of stuff to juggle, a lot of plot lines to tie up, and I just had to try and focus on the stuff that mattered most in the time I had." In addition, he wanted to create an ending that would "compete [...] a little" with the ending of the film version; he was aware of "how BIG the finale was". About the ending, O'Malley said, "I think the stuff with the girls and the relationships works pretty well and the stuff with Gideon and the glow is weaker. But hey, some people love it warts and all, and it's not like I'm gonna go back and change it."

To illustrate his reasoning for eventually ending the Scott Pilgrim series, O'Malley used a quote from famed Belgian comics writer and artist Hergé, creator of the Adventures of Tintin comic book series, from 1929 until his death in 1983. Hergé told his wife, "And right now, my work makes me sick. Tintin is no longer me. And I must make a terrible effort to invent [him] ... If Tintin continues to live, it is through a sort of artificial respiration that I must constantly keep up and which is exhausting me." O'Malley said, "If I was still doing Scott Pilgrim in ten years, I would be dead inside." O'Malley said that he did conceive of a continuation centering on Scott and Ramona and involving the other major characters, except for Gideon and the other evil exes of Ramona. He said, "maybe in a few years I'd think about playing with Scott Pilgrim some more" and although "there doesn't need to be more Scott Pilgrim", he agreed that "more would be fun".

The cover of the third Japanese Scott Pilgrim volume, which includes content from the original volumes 5 and 6, was based on an illustration from Street Fighter Alpha 2 (Street Fighter Zero 2).

O'Malley used the font Swiss 721 Bold Condensed, which was also used in the film. In later books, the regular weight and italic versions of this font were also used. M04 FATAL FURY is the pixel font used in Book 4 and beyond.

== Synopsis ==
The series follows the escapades of Scott Pilgrim, a 23-year-old Canadian slacker from Toronto, who lives in a very modest apartment with his gay roommate Wallace Wells, and is a bass guitarist in the local garage band "Sex Bob-Omb" with his friends Stephen Stills and Kim Pine. Scott is initially dating a 17-year-old high school student named Knives Chau, but he soon falls for a mysterious American woman named Ramona Flowers, who recently moved to Toronto and appeared in his dreams.

As Scott desperately tries to initiate a relationship with Ramona, he finds out that he must defeat her "seven evil exes", each with supernatural abilities, in order to be with her. Amidst the battles, the story also includes several flashbacks that focus on Scott's adolescent experiences and previous tumultuous relationships, offering insights into his past and the origins of his fears and insecurities.

== Main characters ==
- Scott William Pilgrim – The titular protagonist, a 23-year-old slacker who is a bassist in the local garage band "Sex Bob-Omb" and cited as the best fighter in Ontario. Scott finds out he has to defeat the seven "evil exes" of his love interest, Ramona Flowers.
- Ramona Victoria Flowers – A mysterious American girl, working as a courier for Amazon, who recently moved to Toronto from New York and who becomes Scott's primary love interest. She is able to use interdimensional "Subspace" to travel long distances quickly often using Scott's head to go through, and frequently changes her hairstyle.
- Knives Chau – An innocent 17-year-old high school student of Chinese descent whom Scott is dating at the start of the series. Scott breaks up with her after he meets Ramona, and Knives repeatedly attempts to win him back through violence before moving away.
- Wallace Wells – Scott's "cool gay roommate".
- Stephen Stills – The lead singer and guitarist of Sex Bob-omb. Found out to be Gay in Volume 6.
- Kimberly "Kim" Pine – The drummer of Sex Bob-omb. She was Scott's first girlfriend in high school.
- Stacey Pilgrim – Scott's pragmatic younger sister.
- "Young" Neil Nordegraf – Stephen's roommate and fan of Sex Bob-omb.
- Natalie "Envy" Adams – A successful pop star and Scott's ex-girlfriend.

== Plot ==
=== Scott Pilgrim's Precious Little Life (Volume 1) ===
Twenty-three year old Canadian slacker Scott Pilgrim lives in Toronto, Canada. He lives in a cheap apartment with his gay roommate Wallace, performs in the band "Sex Bob-Omb" along with his best friend Stephen Stills and ex-girlfriend Kim Pine, and is casually dating a seventeen-year-old high school girl named Knives Chau. Kim, Wallace, and Scott's sister Stacey resent this idea, but Stephen and his roommate, "Young" Neil Nordegraf, support it, especially when Knives becomes obsessed with their band.

One night, Scott begins to have recurring dreams of a pink-haired girl, whom he falls in love with. After seeing the same girl at the library, he becomes determined to go out with her; his obsession causes him to spend less time with Knives and put less effort into the band. Later, at a party hosted by Stephen's girlfriend Julie Powers, Scott discovers that the girl's name is Ramona. Scott awkwardly interacts with her, then secretly stalks her until she leaves the party. Julie and Stephen inform him that Ramona just had a bad breakup with someone named Gideon, motivating Scott to pursue her. After learning she works at Amazon, he buys multiple CDs in an attempt to see her.

On Scott's next date with Knives, she kisses him, causing him to freak out. The next day, Stephen informs the group that Sex Bob-Omb will play in a battle of the bands with another popular band called Crash and the Boys. Later that day, Ramona delivers Scott's package. She reveals that she can travel quickly over long distances using a "subspace highway", an interdimensional transitway that passes through people's minds; Scott's mind is so empty that he is able to see her in his dreams. Scott awkwardly asks her out, and she accepts. They end up at Ramona's house and almost have sex, but decide not to. While there, Scott notices a mysterious letter from Gideon. Ramona agrees to come to Scott's battle of the bands, and they officially start dating. When he informs Wallace about this, Wallace forcefully tells him to break up with Knives.

At the battle of the bands, Crash and the Boys knock the audience unconscious with a song so they can win the battle of the bands by default. When Sex Bob-Omb begins to play anyway, a mysterious man crashes through the ceiling and attacks Scott, introducing himself as Matthew Patel, Ramona's first "Evil Ex-Boyfriend". Ramona explains that they barely dated in middle school. Scott and Matthew fight, initiating a music battle between Sex Bob-Omb and Matthew's "Demon Hipster Chicks". Scott defeats Matthew, shattering him into $2.10 in Canadian currency. On the bus ride home, Ramona informs Scott that he must fight her seven evil exes to date her, but they agree to continue their relationship. When Scott asks if Gideon is one of the evil exes, Ramona's head begins glowing and she doesn't answer.

=== Scott Pilgrim vs. the World (Volume 2) ===
In a flashback to Scott's teen years, Scott met Kim and a girl named Lisa Miller after transferring to a new school, and the three started a band. The following week, a gang controlled by a bully named Simon Lee kidnapped Kim, and Scott fought through his forces to rescue her. After saving Kim, the two began dating. Everything went well until Scott had to move to Toronto, causing him to break up with Kim.

In the present, Scott learns that popular movie star and pro skateboarder Lucas Lee is shooting a film in Toronto. Later, while on a date with Knives, Scott breaks up with her after she confesses she is in love with him. Scott copes with his guilt by thinking about Ramona. On his next date with Ramona, she suggests he cut his hair, though he is averse to the idea, associating his last haircut with a previous breakup. The next day, Wallace discovers that Lucas is one of Ramona's ex-boyfriends, which Ramona confirms, though she admits she hardly remembers their relationship. Scott buys many of Lucas's movies to study him, and Ramona's head starts glowing as they watch them. As time passes, Stacey and Ramona start hanging out, much to Scott's chagrin.

Knives, feeling jilted and broken-hearted after seeing Scott on a date with Ramona, swears revenge. She dyes her hair and begins practicing ninjutsu, intending to kill Ramona and win Scott back. Meanwhile, Wallace helps Scott organise a battle with Lucas and accompanies him to it. Scott is quickly overpowered by Lucas' strength before the pair stop to take a lunchbreak and discuss Ramona, where Lucas reveals she broke his heart by abandoning him for her next ex, and reveals the existence of the 'League of Evil Exes'. Thinking quickly, Scott tricks Lucas into attempting a dangerous skateboard grind on the Casa Loma stairway rails; Lucas flies down the stairs at supersonic speeds and combusts at the bottom, leaving behind about $14 in coins and a mithril skateboard. Later that evening, Knives attacks Ramona and Stacey at the Toronto Reference Library. After Ramona defeats her, a fleeing Knives realizes that Scott was actually cheating on her with Ramona.

That night, Scott receives a call from his ex-girlfriend, Envy Adams, who now is a successful pop star with the band The Clash at Demonhead. She asks Sex Bob-Omb to perform at her next concert in a few days, but the call disturbs Scott so much he slips into a brief coma. Things quickly go from bad to worse at Envy's concert: Scott's resolve is shaken, Knives is dating Young Neil as payback for Scott cheating on her, and Ramona informs Scott that Envy's bassist and current boyfriend, Todd Ingram, is Ramona's third evil ex-boyfriend.

=== Scott Pilgrim and the Infinite Sadness (Volume 3) ===
After the show, Sex Bob-Omb meets up with The Clash at Demonhead backstage, and the two bands quickly begin fighting. Todd easily manages to beat Sex Bob-Omb, due to his telekinetic powers that he gained from being completely vegan.

Flashbacks throughout the story portray Scott's university years. He befriended his roommate, Stephen, and started dating his classmate Envy, who was a nerd and went by her birth name, Natalie, at the time. Scott and her began a romantic relationship and started a musical group alongside Stephen. However, as time passed, Natalie expanded the band by recruiting additional members and, ultimately, secured a record deal without obtaining consent, leading to both Scott and Stephen resigning from the group. Natalie, now going by Envy, began cheating on Scott and the two of them ultimately broke up, which Scott insists was Envy's fault despite barely remembering it. Todd's history with Ramona is also revealed: he used his burgeoning vegan powers to punch a hole in the moon for Ramona when they dated, but they broke up when he went to Vegan Academy.

Envy proposes a challenge for Scott and Todd: a fight to the death at Honest Ed's—whoever reaches the end of the store first wins. Neither Scott nor Todd win the challenge, and Todd begins cheating on Envy. At Lee's Palace, Envy and Scott talk backstage, and Scott attempts to apologize to Knives, who believes this means they can get back together. While Sex Bob-omb performs, Ramona and Envy get into an argument and begin to fight, with Envy winning before Ramona is saved by Knives. Envy catches Todd and Lynette Guycott, The Clash at Demonhead's drummer, leaving the bathroom together—her panties on Todd's head. She attempts to attack Lynette, who teleports away. Todd telekinetically flings Envy across the room when she refuses to forgive him for his infidelity, and Scott intercedes before the situation escalates.

Todd and Scott then proceed to have a bass guitar battle, and Todd almost wins the battle until the "vegan police" show up and strip him of his powers for multiple vegan offenses, such as eating gelato. Scott headbutts the powerless Todd, who is reduced to a large pile of coins. Afterwards, Scott receives an extra life. As Sex Bob-Omb finishes playing, Scott notices a mysterious man with glasses leaving the event.

=== Scott Pilgrim Gets It Together (Volume 4) ===
Scott, Ramona, and their friends go to Julie's beach hut for the Summer. Knives and Kim accidentally out themselves as bisexual and make out while blackout drunk, with only Scott remembering it, and Stephen and Julie break up. Kim moves out of her shared flat and in with her friends Hollie and Joseph, the latter of which has a recording studio. Scott reunites with Lisa Miller, who seems to have a crush on him and makes multiple advances at him. Scott and Wallace are faced with the impending deadline of their apartment lease, with Wallace considering moving in with his boyfriend Mobile instead of renewing it. Scott finally decides to be productive and gets a job at the restaurant where Stephen works. Upon meeting Joseph, Stephen becomes obsessed with recording an album, unintentionally disillusioning Kim and Scott from their band.

Scott is repeatedly attacked by an older Asian man, and believes him to be Ramona's next ex. Scott is later attacked by Roxanne "Roxie" Richter, a half-ninja with the same subspace abilities as Ramona, confusing him. Scott later runs into Ramona and Roxie eating lunch at his job, revealing her to be the actual fourth evil ex, upending Scott's assumption that all of Ramona's exes were boys. Roxie attacks him, but Ramona fights her instead, until Roxie departs after Ramona insults her. The destruction left behind causes Scott to get fired. He later learns the man is Knives' father, seeking revenge for his treatment of her. After Lisa flirts with Scott too many times, Ramona becomes suspicious that they were a couple, and she asks for some space. Scott ends up staying over at Lisa's, who admits her feelings, but Scott instead declares his love for Ramona. Roxie attacks Scott in a dream, but he awakens before she can kill him. Scott leaves but chooses to get his job back before reuniting with Ramona.

Scott returns to Ramona's, but their quarrel worsens after he accidentally invades her subspace dreams and he learns Roxie is staying with Ramona whilst in Toronto for an art exhibition. He leaves in a daze, but is suddenly confronted by Nega-Scott, however Scott refuses to confront him and runs back to Ramona. He discovers her being attacked by Mr Chau, and pits Roxie and Mr. Chau in battle against each other against Ramona's advice. Scott finally tells Ramona he loves her and will do anything to keep their relationship going. In this act of courage, Scott earns a sword pulled from his heart, the "Power of Love," which he uses to defeat Roxie and gain Mr. Chau's respect. Ramona declares her love for Scott as well and they move in together.

=== Scott Pilgrim vs. the Universe (Volume 5) ===
At a Day of the Dead party, Ramona spots her next two evil ex-boyfriends, Japanese twins Kyle & Ken Katayanagi, who were invited to the party by Julie. However, the twins are uninterested in fighting Scott, instead sending an array of robots after him over the following days. Ramona becomes paranoid over Scott's history of ending relationships and forgetting all about them, and Sex Bob-Omb perform, but due to Stephen's obsession with the album they have had no practice and are awful. Knives confronts Ramona at the gig, where they fight until Knives realizes it is Scott's fault she was cheated on and not Ramona's. Ramona tells Scott they should have time apart. Kim learns her boyfriend, Jason, is cheating on her with Hollie, a revelation that causes Ramona's head to begin glowing.

At a party, Kim manages to take a photo of the glow around Ramona, but Ramona denies knowing what it means. After a nightcap with Scott and Ramona, Kim goes home on the subway but is kidnapped by the twins. Meanwhile, Ramona confronts Scott over his infidelity and is unsatisfied with his evasive answers. Ramona's head begins glowing, and Scott believes she will break up with him. The next morning, Scott fights the twins to save Kim; before they are defeated, the twins reveal that Ramona dated both of them at the same time without the other's knowledge.

Scott tells Ramona he doesn't care about her past and loves her, but she is demoralised and with a new haircut. She thanks him as the glow around her head grows brighter and brighter until she disappears altogether, leaving behind a letter addressed to Gideon. Scott, heartbroken, accidentally locks himself out of his and Ramona's house. Scott stays at his friend's houses as their personal lives deteriorate, such as Kim moving in with her parents in the Canadian wilderness. Scott moves into a new apartment paid for by his parents.

With Gideon being the last evil ex to battle, Scott grows paranoid, perceiving anyone with glasses as Gideon. Gideon calls Scott, and asks him when he wishes to die.

=== Scott Pilgrim's Finest Hour (Volume 6) ===
Jobless, kicked out of Sex Bob-Omb, and scared to face Gideon, Scott spends most of his time alone in his apartment playing video games. He is also plagued by dreams of Ramona and his other ex-girlfriends. When he is finally convinced to go outside, he tries to reconnect with the now-18-year-old Knives, desiring casual sex, but Knives states that she has moved on. She agrees to make out, but the two part after a bad kiss. Envy meets Scott for coffee, but he refuses to make amends with her.

Wallace forces Scott to leave town and stay with Kim and her parents. In the woods, Kim reveals that Scott misremembers their high school days: Simon Lee was Kim's boyfriend, and Scott stole Kim from him after attacking him unprovoked. Remembering this causes Scott's head to glow as an evil doppelganger of Scott to appears, a physical manifestation of his mistakes called Nega-Scott. As they fight, Kim tells him that Nega-Scott will not disappear until he remembers and accepts his past. As Scott acknowledges his mistakes, Nega-Scott stops its assault and merges back into him. Scott comments that he doesn't deserve Ramona, but Kim tells him to fight and earn her back. She gives him one last kiss before Scott returns to Toronto.

Scott arrives at Gideon's venue, the Chaos Theatre, for the final confrontation, where Gideon has collected his own ex-girlfriends as trophies. Scott learns that, whilst he was under the impression Ramona had returned to Gideon, Gideon was under the impression he and Ramona were still together, leading to them having no proper reason to fight. Gideon consequently offers Scott a position in the League of Evil Exes, but he refuses. Gideon stuns Scott with a punch, pulls Scott's "Power of Love" sword from his chest, and impales him with it, killing him. In limbo, Scott reunites with Ramona, who had been staying with her father, and they reconcile. Ramona apologizes for leaving him but admits she has only returned to confront Gideon, not to restart their relationship. Scott uses his extra life from Part 3 to bring himself back to life, bringing Ramona with him.

Gideon reveals he started the League through a drunken rant on Craigslist after Ramona dumped him and was shocked that she hurt her exes enough that they replied. The Glow is a side effect of a weapon Gideon uses to cause depression by trapping people in their own minds. Ramona decides to run away but is killed by Gideon before she can teleport fully. Scott and Gideon fight in Ramona's mind, where a part of Ramona is still subservient to Gideon. However, present Ramona and other versions of herself appear, rejecting him. Ramona sacrifices her subspace bag to return the three to the real world. Scott sees Gideon objectifying Envy, prompting him to realize how badly his relationships with Knives, Kim, and Envy ended, thus generating a new sword — the "Power of Understanding." Ramona wields the "Power of Love" sword, which heals her injuries, and they deliver the final blow to Gideon. Gideon bursts into $7,777,777 worth of coins, pouring down painfully on the crowd. Envy hugs Scott, bringing their relationship to a proper close, and Gideon's ex-girlfriends are released from their capsules.

Leaving the club, Scott and Ramona reaffirm their relationship and agree to give it another shot. Scott becomes a prep cook and finds out that Stephen is gay and is currently dating Joseph. Scott and Kim start a new band called Shatter Band, but they only play covers and for fun. The next day, Scott sees Knives off to college. Finally, Scott meets up with Ramona, who is waiting for him at a subspace door, ready to begin their relationship anew. They then hold hands and disappear over the threshold together.

== Critical reception ==
Publishers Weekly ranked the third volume, Scott Pilgrim & The Infinite Sadness, as one of the best comic books of 2006 in a critics' poll.

Scott Pilgrim was ranked 85th on Wizard magazine's 2008 list of the "200 Greatest Comic Characters of All Time".

In 2007, O'Malley was interviewed by The A.V. Club for the fourth volume. Written by Jason Heller, the article states that Gets It Together is "his best to date." The article goes on to praise O'Malley's consistent bold stylistic choices, saying that he "has raised the bar, art-wise: His deceptively basic style is suddenly deeper, richer, and more mature, while his eye for dynamics and graphic economy has gotten even keener." In 2011 Scott Pilgrim was ranked 69th in IGN's list of the top 100 comic book heroes.

Japanese comics author Kentaro Takekuma said in an interview that the structure and style of Scott Pilgrim initially did not match the structure and style of Japanese comics, but when he read the battle scenes "it feels very much like a Japanese manga, especially in how you structured the panels. It develops into a very strange, neither American nor Japanese atmosphere." Comics author Koji Aihara added that "I did feel the inspiration from Japanese manga, but it did not strike me as a ripoff of manga style, but a very unique way of expression, I found it a very interesting work. I appreciated you using your own style of expression. Also, I thought your use of solid blacks was very skilled and attractive."

=== Awards ===
In 2005, O'Malley won the Doug Wright Award for Best Emerging Talent for the first volume of Scott Pilgrim and was nominated for three Harvey Awards (Best New Talent, Best Cartoonist and Best Graphic Album of Original Work).

In 2006, O'Malley was awarded Outstanding Canadian Comic Book Cartoonist (Writer/Artist) in the Joe Shuster Awards. He was previously nominated in the same category in 2005.

O'Malley was nominated for a 2006 Eisner Award in the category Best Writer/Artist—Humor, for Scott Pilgrim Vs. The World, but lost to Kyle Baker. O'Malley and Scott Pilgrim were also nominated for two 2006 Eagle Awards, and nominated for a second Wright Award (for Scott Pilgrim Vs. The World).

In 2007, O'Malley won the Harvey Award. The series was also awarded a spot in Entertainment Weekly's 2007 A-List.

In 2010, O'Malley won his first Eisner Award in the "Best Humor Publication" category for Scott Pilgrim Vs. The Universe.

== In other media ==
=== Film ===
The film Scott Pilgrim vs. the World was released on August 13, 2010. It is based on all six volumes of the graphic novel series with the final book being released after original filming wrapped; this led to a new ending being filmed to match the books before the film's release. The film is directed by Edgar Wright and stars Michael Cera and Mary Elizabeth Winstead as Scott and Ramona, respectively.

The film was a critical success, but did not fare well commercially in cinemas. However, its commercial fortunes improved after being released on Blu-ray and DVD. The DVD includes extras including bloopers, outtakes, deleted scenes, storyboards (which include the ending provided by the comics), and trailers. The 2-disc edition includes soundtracks, animation (when Scott dates Kim), and a making-of.

=== Scott Pilgrim vs. The Animation ===
At the 2010 San Diego Comic-Con, Alison Pill (who plays Kim Pine in the movie), revealed that her character's past relationship with Scott will be explored in other media. "There will be a little something-something that will air on Adult Swim," she said. Creator Bryan Lee O'Malley elaborated by stating "It's gonna be like a series of short animations (to promote the movie). One of them will be the Volume 2 high school stuff with Kim and Lisa Miller. I don't know how long it will be but the rough they showed me was like 5 minutes. The stars of the movie will do the voices for the cartoons." Michael Cera and Alison Pill reprise their roles of Scott Pilgrim and Kim Pine from the movie, whilst Mae Whitman and Jason Schwartzman, who play Roxanne Richter and Gideon Graves in the movie, provide voices for Lisa Miller and Simon Lee respectively. The animated short, entitled Scott Pilgrim vs. the Animation, was produced by Titmouse, Inc. and aired on Adult Swim on August 12, 2010, later being released on their website. The short is based on the flashback from the second graphic novel, elaborating on Scott's adventures in high school. The animation features the songs "Post Acid" and "Beach Demon" by Wavves, though it is replaced with the film's soundtrack in the version included on the DVD/Blu-ray release of the film.

=== Video games ===
A video game based on the series, also titled Scott Pilgrim vs. The World, was announced during the 2009 San Diego Comic-Con and was developed by Ubisoft Montreal, released alongside the film. The game is a four-player side-scroller influenced by 8-bit and 16-bit video games, with players able to play as Scott Pilgrim, Ramona Flowers, Kim Pine and Stephen Stills; players can also unlock NegaScott, while Knives Chau and Wallace Wells were added as playable characters via downloadable content. The game features music by chiptune punk band Anamanaguchi and art direction by Paul Robertson.

The game was released on PlayStation Network on August 10, 2010 and Xbox Live Arcade on August 25, 2010.

On December 30, 2014, Scott Pilgrim vs. the World: The Game was delisted from the Xbox Live Arcade and PlayStation Network. This follows similar previous delistings of licensed games such as Uno and Marvel vs. Capcom Origins due to their licenses' expiration. On September 10, 2020, to celebrate its 10th anniversary, Ubisoft announced that the game would finally be re-released with all downloadable content included as Scott Pilgrim vs. the World: The Game – Complete Edition. The game was released on PlayStation 4, Xbox One, Nintendo Switch, PC, and Stadia, on January 14, 2021.

On June 6, 2025, a new Scott Pilgrim game, titled Scott Pilgrim EX, was announced to be in development by Tribute Games, a studio founded by members of the Scott Pilgrim vs. the World: The Game development team, with Anamanaguchi returning to compose the soundtrack. It features an original story written by Lee O'Malley, which takes place after the events of the Scott Pilgrim Takes Off anime series. Scott and Ramona return as playable characters, now joined by Matthew Patel, Lucas Lee, Roxie Richter, Robot-01, and Gideon Graves. The game was released on March 3, 2026.

=== Mobile comic ===
A mobile adaptation of the comic book was produced by HarperCollins and Robot Comics. The app uses movement, sound and vibration to create an original reading experience and includes extra material hidden in the scenes of the comic. It was available for iPhone, iPod Touch, iPad and Android.

=== Anime series ===
An anime series based on the comics was announced to be in development by Universal Content Productions for Netflix on January 7, 2022 with O'Malley writing and executive producing alongside BenDavid Grabinski, Japanese studio Science Saru providing the animation, Eunyoung Choi serving as producer, and Abel Góngora as director. Edgar Wright, Nira Park, Marc Platt, Jared LeBoff, Adam Seigel, and Michael Bacall also receive executive producer credits for the series. On March 30, 2023, it was announced that the original cast from the movie would reprise their roles for the television series, with Anamanaguchi providing original music. The series, titled Scott Pilgrim Takes Off, was released on November 17, 2023, and serves as both a continuation and alternate retelling of the books' events.
