= Pulp (manga magazine) =

American manga magazine

- Cover to the first issue of Pulp, with artwork from Dance till Tomorrow by Naoki Yamamoto
- Editor-in-Chief: Alvin Lu
- Categories: Manga (seinen)
- Frequency: Monthly
- Publisher: Seiji Horibuchi
- First issue: December 1997; 28 years ago
- Final issue: July 2002; 23 years ago
- Company: Viz Media
- Country: United States, Canada
- Based in: San Francisco, California
- Language: English

Pulp was an American manga magazine and literary imprint published by Viz Media from 1997 to 2002. The magazine, which primarily published English-language translations of seinen manga, was the first English-language magazine that published manga aimed at an adult readership.

== History ==
During the anime boom of the 1990s, the initial wave of manga and anime titles localized for English-language audiences were aimed at children, such as Sailor Moon and Pokémon. Upon launching in 1997, Pulp became the first English-language manga magazine to publish manga aimed at an adult audience, and emerged as one of several magazines (along with Raijin Comics, Animerica Extra, and others) to publish manga titles aimed at demographics outside of children's manga.

Pulp published editorial features, media reviews, and longform articles in addition to manga. The magazine expanded in February 2000 to incorporate a wider range of content on Japanese culture, such as photography from Nobuyoshi Araki, reviews by Heinz Insu Fenkl, and "Vulgarity Drifting Diary", a column by sex worker Hikaru Natsumi, nearly doubling the size of the print edition in the process. Pulp also published Pulp Books, a line of non-fiction books created in partnership with Cadence Books.

Sales for Pulp were consistently low. In May 2002, Viz announced that Pulp would cease publication with its August 2002 issue, published in July of that year. The final issue of the magazine focused on contributor interpretations of the theme of "Manga Hell", including the erotic comics of Osamu Tezuka and the horror comics of Kazuo Koike. The magazine's unfinished serialization of Banana Fish continued in Animerica Extra (which itself would fold in 2004), while other titles were published directly as graphic novels by Viz under their Editor's Choice imprint.

== Serializations ==
The following titles were serialized in Pulp:

- Bakune Young by Toyokazu Matsunaga
- Banana Fish by Akimi Yoshida
- Benkei in New York by Jinpachi Mori and Jiro Taniguchi
- Cinderalla by Junko Mizuno
- Dance till Tomorrow by Naoki Yamamoto
- Even a Monkey Can Draw Manga by Koji Aihara and Kentaro Takekuma
- Heartbroken Angels by Masahiko Kikuni
- No. 5 by Taiyō Matsumoto
- Phoenix by Osamu Tezuka
- Short Cuts by Usamaru Furuya
- Strain by Buronson and Ryoichi Ikegami
- Tekkonkinkreet by Taiyō Matsumoto (Note: Published under the title Black and White.)
- Uzumaki by Junji Ito
- Voyeur by Hideo Yamamoto
- Voyeurs, Inc. by Hideo Yamamoto

Titles serialized in Pulp were also published as collected editions by Viz under a Pulp-branded literary imprint with its own unique trade dress.

== Reception and legacy ==
Pulp has been noted as being "instrumental in disseminating manga culture" in North America. The magazine was regarded positively by critics and commentators, with Warren Ellis calling the magazine "amongst the best things currently being published in the English language" and Wizard describing the magazine as "some of the coolest, most subversive manga being translated into English today." Reflecting on the magazine's commercial failure, Viz editor Shaenon K. Garrity described Pulp as publishing "manga most people just weren't ready for, stuff that was too smart, sexy, bloody, creepy, surreal, or just plain untranslatable for prime time."

In 2010 Viz launched the literary imprint Viz Signature and the digital distribution platform SigIKKI (an online English version of Monthly Ikki), both of which publish manga aimed at adult audiences. Pulp was noted by Viz as a forerunner to both platforms, with Viz editorial manager Leyla Aker stating that SigIKKI was jokingly referred to as "Pulp 2.0" in internal planning discussions.

== See also ==
- List of manga magazines published outside of Japan
