= List of Ichi the Killer volumes =

Cover of the first volume of Ichi the Killer, released in Japan by Shogakukan on June 5, 1998

The chapters of the Japanese manga Ichi the Killer are written and illustrated by Hideo Yamamoto. The series follows Ichi, a killer for a group of outcasts trying to survive in the yakuza world of the red-light district in Kabukichō, Tokyo. The manga was originally serialized in the Shogakukan magazine Weekly Young Sunday. Shogakukan has collected the chapters into ten tankōbon volumes in Japan from 1998 to 2001. The volumes were republished in 2007.

Yamamoto has also written a predecessor titled Ichi in 1993. Ichi and an extra story titled The Birth were compiled together into Koroshiya Ichi Bangaihen on September 15, 2007.

In August 2024, Seven Seas Entertainment announced that it had licensed the series and will be released in a five-volume omnibus edition starting in July 2025, followed by the release of a "Volume 0".

== Volumes ==
| No. | Original release date | Original ISBN | English release date | English ISBN |
|---|---|---|---|---|
| 1 | June 5, 1998 | 4-09-151512-6 | July 29, 2025 | 979-8-89373-407-2 |
Trying to raise turmoil and make money in the yakuza world of Shinjuku, Kabuki-Cho's red light district, the Old Geezer sends Ichi to kill the boss of the Anjo family. The Old Geezer and his crew: consisting of Ryuu, Inoue, and Noboru, quickly clean up the bodies and steal money from the boss's safe. Before leaving, the Old Geezer leaves behind a number "1" written in blood. The next day, Anjo's top enforcer, Kakihara, discovers that he is missing and begins his search. While Kakihara searches, Ichi is depicted as a psychologically unstable young man, haunted by dreams of being bullied as a child. He lives in the countryside and works at a machine factory, but even with his attempts to work well with others, Ichi often finds himself excluded. The only thing that gives him any real confidence are the martial arts. When training in the martial arts cannot keep Ichi occupied, he visits a prostitute, Sheila, for relief.
| 2 | October 5, 1998 | 4-09-151513-4 | July 29, 2025 | 979-8-89373-407-2 |
The Old Geezer misleads Kakihara into believing that the Funaki family has kidnapped Anjo, and that Suzuki is at the center of the crime. Suzuki is caught and tortured for information—breaking yakuza family rules. The torturing stops when the Funaki boss arrives. To appease the Funaki family and avoid a yakuza war, Kakihara cuts off the tip of his tongue as payment and sets off in his search for the Old Geezer. Visiting Sheila again for relief, Ichi finds her face bandaged and her body severely bruised. Sheila tells Ichi that she wants her pimp dead and he promises to kill him. Ichi follows Sheila home and witnesses her pimp physically and sexually abusing her, which causes him to become sexually aroused.
| 3 | February 5, 1999 | 4-09-151514-2 | October 28, 2025 | 979-8-89373-637-3 |
Kakihara finds out that one of the Old Geezer's crew members, Inoue, is a heroin addict and finds out his location using his dealer. While torturing Inoue for information about Anjo's whereabouts, Inoue reveals that he is actually Kanou, an excommunicated Anjo member. In a state of hysteria, Inoue reveals that Anjo is dead and that Ichi is the killer, and is killed. The Old Geezer and the rest of his crew confront the crippled Suzuki dressed up as Chinese gang members, scaring him into a deal to kill the entire Anjo yakuza family for three hundred million yen. Ichi has another dream but this time about a girl being raped and he begins to make connections between his dream and the recent witnessing of Sheila's abuse. Determined to avenge Sheila, Ichi sharpens the blade in his boot and sets out to confront Sheila's pimp. When Ichi comes face to face with the pimp, he has a flashback to a past encounter with a bully, prompting Ichi to burst into tears and go into a killing rampage leaving the pimp sliced in half. When Sheila enters the room, she is shocked at the sight. Ichi attempts to appease her by stating that he could abuse her now, but she growing angry at his actions. Remembering the Old Geezer's orders to kill anyone that sees him, Ichi bursts into tears again and kills Sheila.
| 4 | May 1, 1999 | 4-09-151515-0 | October 28, 2025 | 979-8-89373-637-3 |
Convinced by Suzuki that he is responsible for killing Anjo, Kaichou disowns Kakihara from the Anjo family. However, Kakihara goes rogue with his group, and bullies and tortures people in Shinjuku to maintain business. Coming out of one of his torture sessions, Kakihara unknowingly runs into Ichi when the latter falls off his bike to avoid hitting him. When the two look face to face, Ichi has another flashback of being bullied. When they meet later, the Old Geezer suspects Ichi has been killing unordered and grows irritated. Ichi reveals that he has been having reoccurring dreams and that he is psychologically troubled. Ichi is assigned to live in a run-down telephone club in the yakuza mansion where the newly formed Kakihara family resides. The room gets a call from a woman who talks about S&M, which gives Ichi the same thrill he had with Sheila. At the same time, Suzuki convinces the other yakuza factions to vacate the mansion. The Old Geezer assigns Ichi to kill three people in the Kakihara family, planning to scare away the remaining members.
| 5 | October 5, 1999 | 4-09-151516-9 | February 24, 2026 | 979-8-89373-638-0 |
Ichi proceeds to kill the three men in a very gruesome fashion, leaving Kakihara impressed. Once Ichi recalls the murders, he tells the Old Geezer that he wants to quit. The murders cause a majority of Kakihara's men to leave out of fear, with only three accomplices remaining. Ichi complains to the Old Geezer of puking every time he recalls the girl that was raped and of an erection that will not go away. He tries to relieve it at a pink salon and ends up getting harassed by a pimp. Kaneko, one of Kakihara's men, saves him and the two befriend each other. Suzuki sends Kakihara the severed middle fingers of the men that left, prompting him to call in a pair of twins from his old faction: Jiro and Saburo. Meanwhile, Karen, a friend of Kakihara, starts searching for Ryuu's girl so that they can locate him. The twins entertain themselves with two women, but end up making one bald and cutting the other's nipples off because of their overcompetetive natures.
| 6 | March 4, 2000 | 4-09-151517-7 | February 24, 2026 | 979-8-89373-638-0 |
Karen manages to locate Ryuu's girl, Miyuki, and Jiro and Saburo damage her breasts. Karen finds a girl who can impersonate Miyuki's voice to lure Ryuu into an ambush. The twins proceed to rape Miyuki and torture Ryuu. He divulges the location of the hideout once they threaten to kill Miyuki. The twins then brutally torture him to death and kill Miyuki in one punch. When he learns of Ryuu leaving the hideout, the Old Geezer tells Noboru to flee. He is stopped by Kaneko, and Noboru shoots at him but misses. Kaneko collapses and cowers. Noboru then fights Kakihara, who demonstrates an extreme threshold for pain, taking pleasure from it. Kakihara and Kaneko capture him.
| 7 | July 5, 2000 | 4-09-151518-5 | May 26, 2026 | 979-8-89373-639-7 |
Ichi recalls the rape of the girl in detail and finds that he still cannot ejaculate. He receives another call from the masochistic girl, who discusses being raped in front of the school pariah and how she wanted him to rape her. She articulates that she wanted to be raped by someone who had no regard for others, which causes Ichi to ejaculate. Kakihara plans to cut Noboru's penis in half, causing him to confess that all he knows is that Ichi is in a slump, but Kakihara does it anyway. The Old Geezer gives Ichi six sealed envelopes containing pictures of targets. The Old Geezer then takes out Takayama the bodyguard, snapping his neck upwards with his muscular body. He reveals that he is actually in his thirties and has had plastic surgery in order to disguise his appearance. He then tells Ichi to kill two of the targets, one of them being Jiro.
| 8 | January 10, 2001 | 4-09-151519-3 | May 26, 2026 | 979-8-89373-639-7 |
When Ichi tries to kill him, Jiro removes Ichi's shoe with the blade and tries to overwhelm him with strength, but Ichi uses his legs to snap Jiro's neck in the same manner as the Old Geezer killed Takayama. He then proceeds to kill Noboru, the second target, and ejaculates. After discovering his brother's death, Saburo goes and kills Suzuki out of frustration. The Old Geezer then instructs Ichi to open three envelopes containing pictures of the remaining members of Kakihara's group. Ichi expresses reservations about killing Kaneko, but the Old Geezer likens him to a childhood bully of his who pretended to be a friend. Karen tells Kakihara's group that she discovered that Ichi is living in the mansion.
| 9 | April 5, 2001 | 4-09-152119-3 | October 6, 2026 | 979-8-89561-360-3 |
The group starts searching for Ichi in the mansion, with Kaneko searching separately. Ichi receives another call from the masochistic girl and she describes another bullying incident right before she was raped in which the pariah's supposed friend bullied him also. Ichi vows to avenge her. When trying to kill him, Ichi fails to surprise Saburo with his high kick, but chops off his skull when he drops his knife. He starts to confront Kakihara, but snaps back to reality. This causes the Old Geezer to call Kaneko and direct him to the group. Kakihara's needle stab puts Ichi back in his old mindset and he cuts off his arm. Kaneko catches up to them and shoots Ichi despite his protests. Ichi, getting flashbacks of the bullying friend, flies into a rage and kills him.
| 10 | July 5, 2001 | 4-09-152120-7 | October 6, 2026 | 979-8-89561-360-3 |
Kakihara and Ichi fight. Ichi cuts Kakihara's penis in half and he feels dangerous pain for the first time, causing him to flee. Kakihara jumps and grabs on to the railing of an adjacent apartment, falling to his death when a pigeon defecates on his severed fingers causing him to slip. The masochistic girl calls Ichi again, wanting to meet him at a hotel; she is revealed as Karen in bed with the Old Geezer. The Old Geezer tells Ichi to open the last envelope, which contains a picture of Karen, and tells him to kill her. Ichi proceeds to kill her and ejaculates on her face. Three years later, the Old Geezer is shown speaking on the phone describing how Ichi's ability as a killing machine came from the right mix of imagination and reality, but he became useless from staying in Shinjuku because it provided an outlet for this imagination, effectively curing his insanity. However, he says that he has a potential new killing machine in Takeshi, Kaneko's son. The receiver of the call is revealed to be a lady from a paid telephone service and her coworker describes him as a regular caller who is an old man with Alzheimer's. Meanwhile, Ichi (now known by his real name, Shiroishi, and barely recognizable in his appearance and sane demeanor) sees Takeshi covered in blood and wielding a knife; when questioned, Takeshi answers him coldly and flees. Shiroishi kicks a can in frustration, hitting a Yakuza boss. The series ends on his crying face as he is about to be punched by the boss.
