= Voyeur (manga) =

Japanese manga series

- Cover of Voyeur, featuring Takuro

のぞき屋 (Nozokiya)
- Genre: Drama, thriller
- Manga

Voyeur and Voyeurs, Inc.
- Written by: Hideo Yamamoto
- Published by: Shogakukan
- English publisher: NA: Viz Media
- Imprint: YS Comics
- Magazine: Weekly Young Sunday
- English magazine: NA: Pulp
- Original run: 1992 – 1997
- Volumes: 12
- Live-action film

Nozokiya
- Directed by: Tadafumi Tomioka
- Produced by: Mitsuru Kurosawa
- Written by: Shoichi Maruyama
- Studio: Toei
- Released: May 13, 1995
- Television drama

Nozokiya
- Directed by: Kiyoshi Yamamoto
- Written by: Yasutoshi Murakawa
- Original network: TV Tokyo
- Original run: April 2, 2007 – July 2, 2007
- Episodes: 12

Voyeur, also known as Nozokiya (Japanese: のぞき屋), is a Japanese manga series written and illustrated by Hideo Yamamoto. The series and its sequel Voyeurs, Inc. (Japanese: 新・のぞき屋, Hepburn: Shin Nozokiya; lit. The New Voyeur) were serialized in the manga magazine Weekly Young Sunday from 1992 to 1997. The series broadly focuses on individuals who engage in voyeurism for both sexual gratification and investigative purposes. Voyeurs, Inc. has been adapted twice: as a live-action film produced by Toei in 1995, and as a live-action television drama produced by TV Tokyo in 2007. In North America, an English-language translation of Voyeur and the first three volumes of Voyeurs, Inc. were published by Viz Media, which also serialized the series in its manga magazine Pulp.

== Synopsis ==
=== Voyeur ===
Ko, a young man visiting a parking lot popular for hookups with his girlfriend Satomi, confronts Takuro, a peeping tom spying on couples using a night-vision device. Takuro states that his voyeurism allows him to see a person's true nature, and mocks Ko for "hiding behind his smile". The encounter stokes paranoia in the otherwise cheerful Ko, who becomes convinced that Satomi is unfaithful to him. Ko begins to observe Satomi with Takuro, and they ultimately discover her having sex with another man. Ko discloses to Takuro that as a child, he adopted a personality of forced kindness as a coping mechanism to deal with his trust issues, after a friend murdered his pet dog in jealousy when Ko was selected over him to participate in a karate competition. Ko and Takuro jointly establish "Voyeurs, Inc.", a security and private investigation company.

=== Voyeurs, Inc. ===
Voyeurs, Inc. transplants the concept of a voyeuristic private investigation company to a new cast of characters: veteran investigator Ken, his associate Cho, and their novice apprentice Smile. They are later joined by Reika Takamizawa, a student who was initially the subject of one of Voyeurs, Inc.'s investigations. The series follows the group as they are hired by clients to investigate various individuals.

== Characters ==
Ken (ケン)
Portrayed by: Shunsuke Matsuoka (film), Yusuke Izaki (television drama)
The head of Voyeurs, Inc., and an expert wiretapper and lockpicker. He has a cataract in his left eye – which he claims can read people's minds – for which he wears a thick contact lens.
Reika Takamizawa (高見沢レイカ)
Portrayed by: Asaka Seto (film), Rina Akiyama (television drama)
A brilliant and cunning student who secretly operates a prostitution ring. She is initially investigated by Voyeurs, Inc. at the behest of her father, but later joins the group.
Cho (チョウ)
Portrayed by: Takanori Jinnai (film), Tetsu Watanabe (television drama)
An investigator at Voyeurs, Inc. with a heightened sense of hearing.
Smile (スマイル)
Portrayed by: Jun Murakami (film), Kohei Kuroda (television drama)
A hot-headed apprentice at Voyeurs, Inc. who seeks to be an investigator.
Husky (ハスキー)
A pet dog kept by the group.

== Media ==
=== Manga ===
Voyeur was serialized in the manga magazine Weekly Young Sunday in 1992, while its sequel Voyeurs, Inc. was serialized in Weekly Young Sunday from 1993 to 1997. The series was written and illustrated by Hideo Yamamoto, who stated that he wished to use the series to depict "the spiritual crisis of the modern era", and "people's longing for a sense of security".

In Japan, the series was collected into 12 collected tankōbon volumes published by Shogakukan. In North America, an English-language translation of Voyeur and the first three volumes of Voyeurs, Inc. were published by Viz Media, which also serialized the series in its manga magazine Pulp. Pulp simultaneously serialized Voyeurs, Inc. and Short Cuts by Usamaru Furuya, both of which include prostitution as subject material; as such, it published "Vulgarity Drifting Diary", a column by sex worker Hikaru Natsumi, to provide an alternate perspective on the issue.

No.	Original release date	Original ISBN	English release date	English ISBN
0 (Note: Voyeur was published as a single unnumbered tankōbon volume, while Voyeurs, Inc. was published as eleven numbered tankōbon volumes.)	January 1993	978-4091514417	May 6, 1999	978-1569313664
1	March 1994	978-4091514424	May 6, 2000	978-1569315095
2	July 1994	978-4091514431	May 8, 2001	978-1569315675
3	January 1995	978-4091514448	January 9, 2002	978-1569316504
4	May 1995	978-4091514455	–	—
5	October 1995	978-4091514462	–	—
6	March 1996	978-4091514479	–	—
7	April 1996	978-4091514486	–	—
8	August 1996	978-4091514493	–	—
9	November 1996	978-4091514509	–	—
10	March 1997	978-4091515209	–	—
11	May 1997	978-4091521118	–	—

=== Live-action film ===
In 1995, Voyeurs, Inc was adapted into a live action film by Toei under the title Nozokiya. The film was directed by Tadafumi Tomioka and starred Shunsuke Matsuoka as Ken, Asaka Seto as Reika, Takanori Jinnai as Cho, and Jun Murakami as Smile.

=== Television drama ===
In 2007, Voyeurs, Inc was adapted into a live-action television drama that aired on TV Tokyo under the title Nozokiya. The series was directed by Kiyoshi Yamamoto and written by Yasutoshi Murakawa, and aired from April 2 to July 2, 2007.

== Reception ==
In his review of Voyeur for the American manga magazine Manga Max, Lee Brimmicombe-Wood described the series as "disturbing and provocative", and "a brave strip for Viz to publish". Christopher Kinsey of Anime Outsiders praised the series' writing and art style, noting that the style of the latter "gives you a breather from the rather weighty" subject material of the series.
