= 1-Ichi =

2003 film

- Directed by: Tanno Masato
- Written by: Sakichi Satō
- Based on: 1-Ichi by Hideo Yamamoto
- Produced by: Unknown
- Starring: Chisato Amate; Kōji Chihara; Yuki Oikawa; Nao Omori; Mr Dai
- Cinematography: Naosuke Imaizumi
- Edited by: Unknown
- Music by: Tadanobu Asano
- Release date: January 24, 2003
- Running time: 83 minutes
- Country: Japan

1-Ichi (1-イチ-) is a 2003 Japanese direct-to-video crime action film directed by Tanno Masato. It is a prequel to the 2001 film Ichi the Killer directed by Takashi Miike. Nao Omori reprises his role as a younger version of Ichi.

== Plot ==
Dai is the best fighter in his school. Every time he fights, Shiroishi is there with a big smile on his face. Dai thinks that Shiroishi is making fun of him, but in fact, he appreciates seeing all the violence that comes from fighting. Everybody bullies, makes fun of and mocks Shiroishi, even the youngest in his karate course. But Shiroishi refuses to lose his temper and fight the others. However, a new student starts to make himself known by beating up all the students. In a fight with the new student, Dai ends up on the ground, completely destroyed. It seems that the new student will also beat up Shiroishi, but it seems that he will be the only one who will be able to provide a challenge.

== Cast ==
- Chisato Amate as Satomi
- Kōji Chihara as Onizame
- Yuki Oikawa as Nao
- Nao Omori as Ichi
- Teah as Dai
