= Chisato Amate =

Japanese actress (born 1980)

- 天手 千聖
- Born: December 16, 1980 (age 45); Fukuoka Prefecture, Japan
- Occupation: actress

Chisato Amate (天手 千聖, Amate Chisato; born 16 December 1980, in Fukuoka Prefecture) is a Japanese actress. She played the lead actress role in 1-Ichi, a prequel to Ichi the Killer. In 2004, she played a supporting role in Izo. With Azuma Mami she is part of a CM duo called G☆cups, a reference to their large busts (Chisato's, at 86 cm, is large for a Japanese woman).

== Filmography ==
1. 1-Ichi (1 イチ, 2003)
2. 雀鬼くずれ (2003)
3. 実録・九州やくざ列伝 兇犬とよばれた男 (2003)
4. 実録・事件 青梅「姉妹」バラバラ殺人 (2004)
5. 北九州ヤクザ戦争 侠嵐 完結編 (2004)
6. すくらんぶるハーツ 恋のソナタ (Sukuramburu hatsu koi no sonata, lit. "Scramble Hearts - Sonata of Love", 2004)
7. Izo (2004)
