= Sakichi =

- Gender: Male

Origin
- Origin: Japanese
- Meaning: Different meanings depending on the kanji used

Sakichi (written: 佐吉) is a masculine Japanese given name. Notable people with the name include:

- Sakichi (佐吉), childhood name of Ishida Mitsunari (石田 三成; 1559–1600), Japanese samurai
- Sakichi Sato (佐藤 佐吉; born 1964), Japanese actor, film director and screenwriter
- Sakichi Toyoda (豊田 佐吉; 1867–1930), Japanese inventor and businessman
