= Eisaku Yoshida =

Japanese freelance actor and singer (born 1969)

- 吉田 栄作
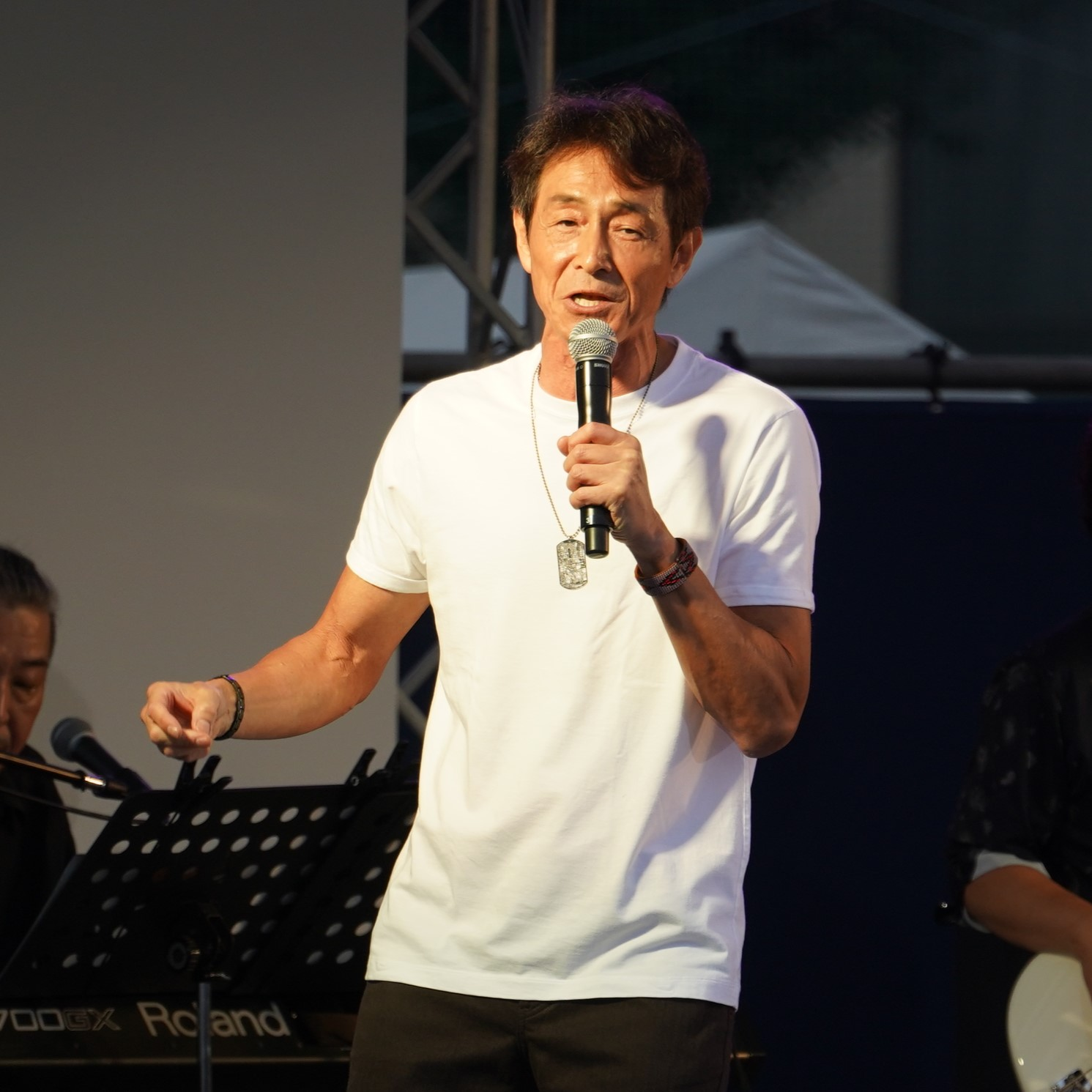
- Born: January 3, 1969 (age 57); Hadano, Kanagawa, Japan
- Occupations: Actor, singer
- Years active: 1988 - 1995; 1998 - present
- Spouses: Risa Hirako (m. 1997; div. 2015) Rina Uchiyama (m. 2021)
- Website: www.dhuta.net/eisaku_yoshida/

Eisaku Yoshida (吉田 栄作, Yoshida Eisaku; born January 3, 1969, in Hadano, Kanagawa, Japan) is a Japanese freelance actor and singer. His ex-wife is model Risa Hirako.

== Filmography ==
=== TV series ===
Year	Title	Role	Notes	Ref.
1990	Christmas Eve	Fujii	Lead role	
1991	I'll Never Love Anyone Anymore	Takuya Sawamura	Lead role	
1999	Genroku Ryōran	Okajima Tadatsugu	Taiga drama	
2008	Dandan	Chu Tajima	Asadora	
2016	My Darling	Kotaro Nakahara		
2021	The Naked Director	investment banker Akira Honda	Season 2	
2022	Prism	Kōtarō Okudera		

=== Films ===
Year	Title	Role	Notes	Ref.
1993	Let's Go to the Diet!	Naoya Kawai	Lead role	
2002	Part-Time Detective	Hitoshi Hibino		
2004	Part-Time Detective 2	Hitoshi Hibino		
2011	Isoroku	Yoshitake Miyake		
2024	Bishu: The World's Kindest Clothes			

=== Dubbing ===
- The West Wing (seasons 1-2), Sam Seaborn (Rob Lowe)
