= Heartbroken Angels =

Japanese manga by Masahiko Kikuni

- Cover of the first volume of the series

傷だらけの天使たち (Kizudarake no Tenshi-tachi)
- Genre: Comedy, yonkoma
- Created by: Masahiko Kikuni
- Manga
- Written by: Masahiko Kikuni
- Published by: Shogakukan
- English publisher: NA: Viz Media
- Imprint: YS Comics
- Magazine: Weekly Young Sunday
- English magazine: NA: Pulp
- Original run: 1988 – 1991
- Volumes: 3

Heartbroken Angels (Japanese: 傷だらけの天使たち, Hepburn: Kizudarake no Tenshi-tachi; lit. "Scarred Angels") is a Japanese manga series written and illustrated by Masahiko Kikuni. It is a yonkoma (four-panel comic) series originally published in the manga magazine Weekly Young Sunday. An English-language translation of the first two volumes of Heartbroken Angels was published by Viz Media, which also serialized the series in its manga magazine Pulp.

== Synopsis ==
Heartbroken Angels is a yonkoma (four-panel comic) series that focuses on vulgar and self-depreciative humor. The series covers a range of subjects using satire and toilet humour, including manga narrative conventions and genre tropes, otaku culture, yakuza, and lolita complexes.

== Publication ==
Heartbroken Angels was originally serialized in the manga magazine Weekly Young Sunday from 1988 to 1991. During its initial serialization, the magazine ran contests where wordless yonkoma were run, and the best dialogue submitted by readers would be published in the magazine.

In Japan, the series was collected into three tankōbon volumes published by Shogakukan. In North America, an English-language translation of the first two volumes of the series were published by Viz Media, which also serialized the series in its manga magazine Pulp.

=== Volume list ===
No.	Original release date	Original ISBN	English release date	English ISBN
1	November 1, 1988	978-4091780782	January 5, 2001	978-1569314371
2	January 22, 1990	978-4091780799	May 25, 2001	978-1569316276
3	September 27, 1991	978-4091780805	—	—

== Reception and impact ==
Christopher Kinsey of Anime Outsider assessed the series as possessing "a penchant for dick jokes before dick jokes became one of the internet's most depreciated currencies," and praised its satirization of traditional manga narratives. During its initial serialization in Pulp, Warren Ellis cited Heartbroken Angels as "amongst the best things currently being published in the English language".

The series is noted for containing the first instance of the term "fap" as onomatopoeia for masturbation, in a story in which God masturbates while looking up a woman's skirt. The use of "fap" in the English-language translation of Heartbroken Angels directly inspired the term's use in the 1999 webcomic The Thin H Line, which subsequently gained popularity as an internet meme.
