= Part-Time Detective =

2002 TV film by Takashi Miike

- Title card
- パートタイム探偵
- Based on: 第2の警察: PRIVATE POLICE by Fumio Watanabe
- Teleplay by: Mitsuru Tanabe
- Story by: Fumio Watanabe
- Directed by: Takashi Miike
- Starring: Keiko Matsuzaka
- Music by: Kōji Endō
- Country of origin: Japan
- Original language: Japanese

Production
- Producers: Toshiyuki Fuwa; Shinji Okabe (TV Tokyo); Keita Hirano (Amuse)
- Cinematography: Shogo Ueno
- Editor: Ryuji Murayama
- Production companies: TV Asahi; BS Japan; Amuse

Original release
- Network: TV Asahi; BS Japan
- Release: December 1, 2002

Part-Time Detective (パートタイム探偵) is a 2002 Japanese crime comedy TV film directed by Takashi Miike.

== Plot ==
When the Yamada family is put on a spending allowance of 1,000 yen per day by their patriarch Kazuo, housewife Noriko unsuccessfully seeks part-time employment throughout Tokyo. She ends up being used as a type of camouflage for the private investigator Mr. Hibino, then begs to be hired as a regular worker. Mr. Hibino reluctantly gives her a one-week trial period, which ends up lasting longer due to developments in a chain of connected investigations involving the apparent suicides of a couple in Meguro as well as the killing of a young bar hostess who was the mistress of one of Kazuo's coworkers.

The bumbling Noriko generally fails to follow protocol, yet sometimes actually aids the detective team of K & D Research in progressing with their investigations. Noriko learns that fervently pursuing a case can lead to unfortunate consequences and ultimately decides to return to her life as a housewife. Some time later, a deliveryman brings her a package with her old work phone in it. When the phone rings, she decides to answer it.

== Cast ==
- Keiko Matsuzaka as Noriko Yamada
- Ren Osugi as Kazuo Yamada
- Eisaku Yoshida as Hitoshi Hibino
  - Riku Suzuki as Young Hitoshi Hibino
- Toshio Kurosawa as Toshio Sengoku
- Yuka Itaya as Kyoko Shinohara
- Hidekazu Nagae as Takafumi Igarashi
- Daisuke Honda as Kotaro Yamada
- Yuna Mikuni (now Marina Kozawa) as Sumire Yamada
- Nobuto Okamoto as Koichi Numata
- Yōji Tanaka as Oshita
- Masami Nakagami (中上雅巳) as Toru Aizawa (相沢徹)
- Maimi Harada as Ayumi Shibusawa
- Kimika Yoshino as Mari Tomishiro a.k.a. "Kotori"
- Tetsuji Tamayama as Shuji Ichinose
- Masaomi Kondō as Yoshihiko Kagami
- Daikichi Sugawara as Ryuichi Shibusawa
- Moeko Ezawa as Ryuichi's mother
- Rika To as Shizuko Shibusawa
- Yoshiki Arizono as Stylist
- Yoshiko Miyazaki as Sachie Kagami
- Anri Otsuka (大塚安里) as Shiho Kagami
- Akihiro Mimura as Shinichi Numata
- Chie Tanaka as Kagami's mistress
- Kota Fukasawa as Hitoshi Hibino's childhood friend
- Mitsuhiro Sato as forensic investigator
- Hajime Tanimoto as cleaning company manager
- Masashi Sekido as restaurant manager
- Hiromasa Yuko as boutique manager
- Anzai Yukiko as adultery drama actress
- Takahiro Tomizawa as adultery drama actor
- Kumiko Sakata (坂田久美子) as woman who finds body in elevator
- Hiroaki Terao (寺尾浩明) as television reporter
- Kuroi Fumie
- Yoshiyuki Sunaga
- Yuki Takato

== Production ==
The ending theme song is "結花" ("Etude") by Yuka Kawamura.

== Broadcast ==
The film was initially broadcast on satellite television on BS Japan on Sunday, December 1, 2002, from 21:00 to 22:54. The film was later broadcast on terrestrial television on TV Tokyo as part of its "Women, Love, and Mystery" programming block on Wednesday, December 11, 2002, from 20:54 to 22:48.

== Reception ==
Panos Kotzathanasis of Asian Movie Pulse praised the acting, writing, "Keiko Matsuzaka is compelling as Noriko Yamada. Her portrayal balances naïveté with determination, and her character's transformation through interactions with Hibino is particularly engaging. [...] Eisaku Yoshida is also effective as the cool yet bitter Hibino." Regarding the technical aspects and plot of the film, he wrote, "Despite not exhibiting much of Miike's signature cinematic style, there are moments that unmistakably bear his imprint. The blurred visuals in certain scenes, the martial arts dream sequence, and the dramatic montage during the final revelations all elevate the production beyond typical television fare."

Reviewer eigasuki wrote, "Compared to typical two-hour dramas and two-hour suspense films, it's full of outrageous direction that's typical of Miike's work. [...] Keiko Matsuzaka fighting the culprit in a nurse's outfit is absolutely fantastic. [...] I laughed at the silly antics of Noriko, the housewife played by Matsuzaka".

== Sequel ==
The film was followed by a sequel, Part-Time Detective 2 (2004).
