= Hikari-Man =

Japanese manga series

- First tankōbon volume cover
- Genre: Action; Science fiction; Superhero
- Manga
- Written by: Hideo Yamamoto
- Published by: Shogakukan
- English publisher: NA: Seven Seas Entertainment
- Magazine: Weekly Big Comic Spirits
- Original run: December 8, 2014 – June 22, 2020
- Volumes: 8
- icon

Hikari-Man (stylized in all caps) is a Japanese manga series written and illustrated by Hideo Yamamoto. It was serialized in Shogakukan's seinen manga magazine Weekly Big Comic Spirits from December 2014 to June 2020, with its chapters collected in eight tankōbon volumes.

== Plot ==
Shirochi Hikari (白池 光, Hikari Shirochi) is a socially isolated otaku obsessed with fighting games and PC modding. Academically average and physically weak, he has electromagnetic hypersensitivity, often forcing him into the school infirmary. Ostracized by peers, he escapes into building and modifying computers—until a static shock violently ejects his consciousness into his PC, granting him the ability to travel through electrical currents. Now, he must choose to use his power for good, or take revenge on his tormentors.

== Publication ==
Written and illustrated by Hideo Yamamoto, Hikari-Man was serialized in Shogakukan's seinen manga magazine Weekly Big Comic Spirits from December 8, 2014, to June 22, 2020. Shogakukan collected its chapters in eight tankōbon volumes, released from February 27, 2015, to September 11, 2020.

In June 2024, Seven Seas Entertainment announced that it had licensed the manga for English release in North America and would release the series in a 2-in-1 omnibus edition, with the first volume published on December 17 of that same year.

=== Volumes ===
No.	Original release date	Original ISBN	English release date	English ISBN
1	February 27, 2015	978-4-09-186768-1	December 17, 2024	979-8-89160-595-4
2	September 30, 2015	978-4-09-187270-8	December 17, 2024	979-8-89160-595-4
3	January 11, 2019	978-4-09-187684-3	March 25, 2025	979-8-89160-907-5
4	January 11, 2019	978-4-09-8601936	March 25, 2025	979-8-89160-907-5
5	April 12, 2019	978-4-09-860258-2	September 30, 2025	979-8-89373-350-1
6	October 11, 2019	978-4-09-860498-2	September 30, 2025	979-8-89373-350-1
7	March 12, 2020	978-4-09-860578-1	January 20, 2026	979-8-89373-351-8
8	September 11, 2020	978-4-09-860746-4	January 20, 2026	979-8-89373-351-8

== Reception ==
Hikari-Man was one of the Jury Recommended Works at the 23rd Japan Media Arts Festival in 2020.
