= Part-Time Detective 2 =

2004 TV film by Takashi Miike

- Title card
- パートタイム探偵2
- Based on: 第2の警察: PRIVATE POLICE by Fumio Watanabe
- Teleplay by: Mitsuru Tanabe
- Story by: Fumio Watanabe
- Directed by: Takashi Miike
- Starring: Keiko Matsuzaka
- Music by: Kōji Endō
- Country of origin: Japan
- Original language: Japanese

Production
- Producers: Akira Sasaki; Osamu Ogawa; Shinji Okabe (TV Tokyo); Keita Hirano (Amuse)
- Cinematography: Hideo Yamamoto
- Editor: Yasushi Shimamura
- Production companies: TV Asahi; BS Japan; Amuse

Original release
- Network: TV Asahi; BS Japan
- Release: February 25, 2004

Part-Time Detective 2 (パートタイム探偵2) is a 2004 Japanese crime comedy TV film directed by Takashi Miike. It is the sequel to the 2002 film Part-Time Detective.

== Plot ==
Rie Odajima hires the detective agency to find out who is harassing her at work. Noriko Yamada is sent to find out more by working undercover as a supposed part-time temp at Odajima's company, Sunrise Dining, a major business that evolved out of a smaller company specializing in wine. When Executive Manager Saburo Motoki and the company president's son Shuzo Fujie are murdered within days of each other, Noriko desires to investigate those crimes as well, despite the reluctance of her employer Mr. Hibino. Noriko's investigations reveal that there are deeper connections between all of the parties in the separate investigations.

== Cast ==
- Keiko Matsuzaka as Noriko Yamada
- Ren Osugi as Kazuo Yamada
- Eisaku Yoshida as Hitoshi Hibino (日比野仁)
- Toshio Kurosawa as Toshio Sengoku
- Yuka Itaya as Kyoko Shinohara
- Hidekazu Nagae as Takafumi Igarashi
- Daisuke Honda as Kotaro Yamada
- Yuna Mikuni (now Marina Kozawa) as Sumire Yamada
- Mirai Yamamoto as Rie Odajima
  - Mao Sasaki as Young Rie Odajima
- Akiko Nishina as Saeko Okazono
- Minori Terada as Shutaro Fujie (藤江修太郎)
- Kazuma Suzuki as Shuzo Fujie (藤江修造)
- Ken Yoshizawa as Saburo Motoki
- Yu Tokui as Kazuo Yamagiwa
- Yoshiki Arizono as Detective Kameda
- Kensuke Aoshima as Detective Tsuruoka
- Kenichi Yajima as Keiichi Toritani
- Atsuko Murakawa as President's Secretary
- Aika Uemura as Rie's colleague
- Naomi Tomita as Rie's colleague
- Hirotada Kobayashi as Sunrise Dining Employee
- Sawa Masaki as Sunrise Dining Employee
- Noriko Eguchi as Sunrise Dining Employee
- Kyoko Matsumoto as New Employee
- Fumie Hosokawa as Kiriko Matsuno
- Maiko Kamiya as woman who finds Shuzo's body
- Kota Otsuka as man accompanying woman who finds Shuzo's body
- Sakichi Sato as Charlie Brown (uncredited)

== Production ==
The ending theme song is "明菜" ("Days") by Akina Nakamori.

== Broadcast ==
The film was initially broadcast on TV Tokyo as part of its "Women, Love, and Mystery" programming block on Wednesday, February 25, 2004, from 20:54 to 22:58.

== Connection to Quentin Tarantino ==
In an interview, director Takashi Miike stated that the film is "dedicated to Tarantino", a long-time fan of Miike.

During a scene in which Noriko fantasizes about being a real detective, one of the enemies demonstrably pushes the play button on a nearby CD player to play "Battle Without Honor or Humanity", with the subtitles reading, "｢ｷﾙ･ﾋﾞﾙ｣のﾃｰﾏ" ("theme from Kill Bill"). Noriko then battles opponents while wearing an outfit reminiscent of the Bride's yellow tracksuit. Sakichi Sato, who appeared as the character Charlie Brown in the Kill Bill films, also makes an uncredited cameo in the scene as a similar character wearing a Kimono and asking (in English) who Noriko is, to which she replies, "Part-Time Detective...2!"

Director Takashi Miike stated in an interview that he jokingly sent the film Part-Time Detective 2 to Quentin Tarantino as a "reference" for Kill Bill: Volume 2, which was being edited at the time.

Tarantino later appeared in Miike's 2007 film Sukiyaki Western Django, released five years before Tarantino's own 2012 film Django Unchained. Tarantino stated that "to actually do it with what I consider one of the greatest directors living today, Miike-san, is actually a dream come true."

== References to other Takashi Miike films ==
The ringtone on Noriko's work phone is the ringtone from the 2003 film One Missed Call, which Takashi Miike also directed.

== Reception ==
Panos Kotzathanasis of Asian Movie Pulse praised the acting, writing, "Keiko Matsuzaka is exceptional as Noriko, portraying her convincingly as a devoted wife and mother, an amateur detective, and even as a confident and attractive middle-aged woman, most memorably in a scene where she appears in a bunny costume." Regarding the technical aspects and plot of the film, he wrote, "The cinematography is polished and functional, exceeding the usual standards of TV production. The wine presentation scenes are visually striking, as are the more violent moments. The editing maintains a brisk pace, fitting the episodic structure, although the plot begins to feel overstretched toward the end in what seems like a forced attempt to lengthen the runtime."

Reviewer eigasuki wrote, "It's a story typical of a two-hour TV drama, but Miike's direction explodes everywhere, reminiscent of the outrageousness of his V-cinema days! Even watching it again now, I'm surprised in many ways that this was actually broadcast on terrestrial television during prime time. It's truly amazing!" The reviewer further notes that the "plot where an ordinary middle-aged woman who has only ever done childcare and housework suddenly transforms into an office lady at a major corporation is just the best." The reviewer concludes that "it's certainly a bizarre masterpiece that overturns the conventional notions of a two-hour drama."
