= Toshio Kurosawa (actor) =

Japanese actor (born 1944)

- 黒沢 年男
- Born: February 4, 1944 (age 82); Yokohama, Kanagawa Prefecture, Japan
- Occupations: Actor, Singer
- Years active: 1964–present
- Agent: Yume Group
- Spouse: Machiko Miyazaki (m. 1976)

Toshio Kurosawa (黒沢 年男, Kurosawa Toshio; born February 4, 1944) is a Japanese actor and singer from Yokohama, Kanagawa Prefecture. Kuroswa joined Toho film studio as an actor and made his film debut with Hibari Chiemi Izumi Sanninyoreba in 1964. His first starring role was in the 1966 film Hikinige. In 1971, Kurosawa left Toho and became a freelance actor.

His song Tokiniwa Shōfu no Yōni became a big hit in 1978.

== Selected filmography ==
=== Film ===
- Hibari・Chiemi・Izumi Sanninyoreba (1964)
- Samurai Assassin (1965)
- Ereki no Wakadaishō (1965) as Izawa
- Hikinige (1966)
- Izu no Odoriko (1966)
- The Stranger Within a Woman (1966) as Bartender
- Japan's Longest Day (1967) as Hatanaka Kenji
- Admiral Yamamoto (1968) as Kimura Keisuke
- Hymn to a Tired Man (1969) as Zensaku's son
- Battle of the Japan Sea (1969) as Pfc. Maeyama Sankichi
- Yajyū-toshi (1970)
- The Militarists (1970) as Shimagaki
- Hakuchu no Shugeki (1970)
- The Wolves (1971) as Tsutomu Onodera
- The Water Margin (1972) as Shi Wengong
- The Human Revolution (1973)
- Lady Snowblood (1973) as Ryūrei Ashio
- Horror of the Wolf (1973) as Akira Jin
- Battles Without Honor and Humanity: Police Tactics (1974) as Shigeru Takemoto
- Evil of Dracula (1974) as Shiraki
- Prophecies of Nostradamus (1974) as Akira Nakagawa
- Karafuto 1945 Summer Hyosetsu no Mon (1974) as Muraguchi
- Best Guy (1990) as Lt. Colonel Tadayuki "Odyssey" Yamamoto
- Kimi no Manazashi (2017)

=== Television ===
- Hissatsu Shiokinin (1973) (ep.4) as Seiten no Masagorō
- The Water Margin (1973) as Dai Zong
- Kage Dōshin II (1975–76) as Hotta Genpachiro
- Japan Sinks (1974–75)
- Kusa Moeru (1979) as Kokemaru
- Doberman Deka (1980) as Jōji Kanō
- The Hungman (1980–82)
- Aoi (2000) as Natsuka Masaie
- Part-Time Detective (2002) as Toshio Sengoku
- Part-Time Detective 2 (2004) as Toshio Sengoku
