= Homunculus (manga) =

Japanese manga series by Hideo Yamamoto

- First tankōbon volume cover

ホムンクルス (Homunkurusu)
- Genre: Psychological horror; Psychological thriller; Supernatural horror
- Manga
- Written by: Hideo Yamamoto
- Published by: Shogakukan
- English publisher: NA: Seven Seas Entertainment
- Magazine: Weekly Big Comic Spirits
- Original run: March 17, 2003 – February 21, 2011
- Volumes: 15
- Live-action film
- Directed by: Takashi Shimizu
- Licensed by: Netflix
- Released: April 2, 2021
- icon

Homunculus (Japanese: ホムンクルス, Hepburn: Homunkurusu) is a Japanese manga series written and illustrated by Hideo Yamamoto. It was serialized in Shogakukan's seinen manga magazine Weekly Big Comic Spirits from March 2003 to February 2011, with its chapters collected in 15 tankōbon volumes. A live-action film adaptation, directed by Takashi Shimizu and starring Gō Ayano premiered in April 2021.

== Plot ==
Trepanation is the procedure of drilling holes in a person's head, supposedly increasing the circulation of blood and helping to improve the pressure inside one's skull, bringing out a person's sixth sense and causing them to gain superhuman powers such as ESP, being able to see ghosts, and controlling objects remotely with one's mind. This is speculative fiction based on the concept of trepanation.

Susumu Nakoshi is a 34-year-old homeless man living out of his car. For two weeks, he has declined his fellow homeless men's invitations to set up a tent with them, preferring to sleep in his car. However, one day, he is accosted by a strange-looking man searching for participants to subject themselves to trepanation. Nakoshi tells the man to leave, and discards the flier he'd placed on his windshield. However, when his car is towed, he agrees to let medical student Manabu Itoh drill a hole in his skull in exchange for ¥700,000. Itoh claims to be interested in trepanation for the sake of science; he is interested in humans, fascinated with ESP and the sixth sense, and wants to disprove the existence of the occult. Itoh's father owns a lab facility, as his father is a rich hospital director. Itoh performs the trepanation surgery on Nakoshi and does a variety of ESP tests. When Nakoshi reveals that he sees distorted humans when using only the left side of his body, Itoh researches and discovers that Nakoshi can see homunculi.

Itoh explains psychoanalytic theory to Nakoshi after the yakuza incident.

== Characters ==
Susumu Nakoshi (名越 進, Nakoshi Susumu)
Portrayed by: Go Ayano
A 34-year-old man. At the beginning of the series, he is shown to be recently homeless and living out of his car. He is living between two worlds, that of the upper class and that of the homeless. He is a former employee of a foreign bank, and a pathological liar. After the trepanation procedure, he gains the ability to see peoples homunculi or "distortions".
Manabu Ito (伊藤 学, Itō Manabu)
Portrayed by: Ryu Ito
A 22-year-old medical student who proposes the trepanation experiment and investigates material relevant to Nakoshi's reports. He dresses in an overtly flamboyant manner, but hides this fact from his ailing father, with whom he has a somewhat strained relationship and who is a high ranking doctor at a hospital.
Yukari (ユカリ) / 1775
A 17-year-old girl working in a burusera salon and one of the first homunculi Nakoshi interacts with.

== Media ==
=== Manga ===
Homunculus, written and illustrated by Hideo Yamamoto, was serialized in Shogakukan's Weekly Big Comic Spirits from March 17, 2003, to February 21, 2011. Shogakukan collected its chapters in 15 tankōbon volumes, released from July 30, 2003, to April 28, 2011. They later republished the series in a ten-volume bunkoban edition from May 15, 2015, to January 15, 2016.

The manga is licensed in North America by Seven Seas Entertainment. They started publishing the series in a 2-in-1 five-volume omnibus edition on June 27, 2023.

==== Volumes ====
===== Original edition =====
No.	Release date	ISBN
1	July 30, 2003	978-4-09-187071-1
2	April 30, 2004	978-4-09-187072-8
3	July 30, 2004	978-4-09-187073-5
4	December 24, 2004	978-4-09-187074-2
5	February 28, 2005	978-4-09-187075-9
6	August 30, 2005	978-4-09-187076-6
7	November 30, 2006	978-4-09-180772-4
8	June 29, 2007	978-4-09-181068-7
9	February 29, 2008	978-4-09-181747-1
10	August 28, 2009	978-4-09-182129-4
11	December 26, 2009	978-4-09-182250-5
12	February 27, 2010	978-4-09-183018-0
13	July 30, 2010	978-4-09-183353-2
14	December 25, 2010	978-4-09-183535-2
15	April 28, 2011	978-4-09-183790-5

===== New edition =====
No.	Original release date	Original ISBN	English release date	English ISBN
1	May 15, 2015	978-4-09-196012-2	June 27, 2023	978-1-68579-729-4
2	May 15, 2015	978-4-09-196013-9	June 27, 2023	978-1-68579-729-4
3	June 13, 2015	978-4-09-196014-6	September 26, 2023	978-1-68579-926-7
4	July 15, 2015	978-4-09-196015-3	September 26, 2023	978-1-68579-926-7
5	August 12, 2015	978-4-09-196016-0	December 19, 2023	978-1-68579-952-6
6	September 15, 2015	978-4-09-196017-7	December 19, 2023	978-1-68579-952-6
7	October 15, 2015	978-4-09-196018-4	March 19, 2024	979-8-88843-354-6
8	November 13, 2015	978-4-09-196019-1	March 19, 2024	979-8-88843-354-6
9	December 15, 2015	978-4-09-196020-7	July 2, 2024	979-8-88843-472-7
10	January 15, 2016	978-4-09-196039-9	July 2, 2024	979-8-88843-472-7

=== Live-action film ===
In September 2020, it was announced that Homunculus would receive a live-action film adaptation. The film is directed by Takashi Shimizu and stars Gō Ayano. It premiered in Japan on April 2, 2021, and premiered exclusively on Netflix worldwide on April 22.

== Reception ==
By September 2020, the Homunculus manga had over 4 million copies in circulation.
