= Risa Hirako =

Japanese fashion model (born 1971)

- 平子 理沙
- Born: February 14, 1971 (age 55); Tokyo, Japan
- Occupation: Model
- Years active: 1990 -
- Height: 164 cm (5 ft 5 in)
- Spouse: Eisaku Yoshida (1997 - 2015)

Risa Hirako (平子 理沙, Hirako Risa; born February 14, 1971, in Tokyo, Japan) is a Japanese fashion model who is represented by Newpower. She produced fashion brands and appeared in the music industry. Her ex-husband is actor Eisaku Yoshida.

== Filmography ==
=== TV series ===
Year	Title	Network	Notes
2009	BeauTV: VoCE	TV Asahi, BS Asahi	
	F1 Pole Position	Fuji TV	
