= Fumie Hosokawa =

Japanese actress, singer, and model (born 1971)

- Born: 2 September 1971 (age 55); Mutsu, Aomori Prefecture, Japan
- Years active: 1990–present
- Height: 1.63 m (5 ft 4 in)
- Spouse: Hisato Endo (m. 2007; div. 2009)
- Children: 1

Fumie Hosokawa (細川 ふみえ; born 2 September 1971) is a Japanese actress, singer, and model. She is often referred to as the "original" kyonyu (huge breasts) idol.

== Life and career ==
Hosokawa was born in Mutsu, Aomori Prefecture and lived in Etajima, Hiroshima Prefecture until the age of four. She then moved to Hawaii for a year to attend school there. She is the daughter of a rear admiral in the Japan Maritime Self-Defense Force.

She started posing for magazines in December 1990 as a bikini model. Soon afterwards she also started singing and acting in films.

She is 163 cm (5 ft 4 in) tall. Her official website charts her changing figure over time. In 1990 she was 94-60-90 cm (37-24-35 inches). In 2006 she was 90-59-87 cm (35-23-34 inches). After a lengthy hiatus from bikini modelling, she released two gravure idol DVDs in 2006.

On 20 December 2007 she gave birth to her first child, a boy, with husband Hisato Endo, and announced her withdrawal from celebrity life. However, before giving birth, she had posed for her first-ever nude photo book, 'Fumming', which was released in August 2007.

However, in December 2009, a Japanese sports newspaper reported that she and Endo were divorced.

She made a comeback to celebrity life in March 2014, after she appearing at Sunday Japon on TBS.

== Partial filmography ==
1. SHIN PRODUCE Fumie Hosokawa Mitsumete (gravure) (2006)
2. Sei (gravure) (2006)
3. Part-Time Detective 2 (TV film) (2004) as Kiriko Matsuno
4. Idol Ougon Densetsu (Idol Golden Legend) (gravure) (2004)
5. Shōwa kayō daizenshū (2003)
6. Sennen no koi - Hikaru Genji monogatari (2001)
7. Kikujirō no natsu (1999)
8. Hana no oedo no Tsuribaka Nisshi (1998)
9. Tsuribaka Nisshi 10 (1998)
10. Gokudo no onna-tachi: Kejime (1998)
11. Tsuribaka nisshi 9 (1997)
12. Purupuru Tenshi Kyoshitsu (1993)

== Sources ==
- Connell, Ryann (14 September 2007). "Fumie Hosokawa's triple trouble: single, unemployed, and possibly preggers". Mainichi Shimbun. Archived from the original on 3 November 2007.
- 細川ふみえ (Hosokawa Fumie) Filmography at jmdb.ne.jp (in Japanese)
- 細川ふみえ (Hosokawa Fumie) Profile at Web I-dic (in Japanese)
