= Adam and Eve (manga) =

Japanese manga series

- First tankōbon volume cover

アダムとイブ (Adamu to Ibu)
- Genre: Action; Supernatural; Yakuza
- Manga
- Written by: Hideo Yamamoto
- Illustrated by: Ryoichi Ikegami
- Published by: Shogakukan
- Magazine: Big Comic Superior
- Original run: October 9, 2015 – July 22, 2016
- Volumes: 2
- icon

Adam and Eve (Japanese: アダムとイブ, Hepburn: Adamu to Ibu) is a Japanese manga series written by Hideo Yamamoto and illustrated by Ryoichi Ikegami. It was serialized in Shogakukan's seinen manga magazine Big Comic Superior from October 2015 to July 2016, with its chapters collected in two tankōbon volumes.

== Publication ==
Adam and Eve, written by Hideo Yamamoto and illustrated by Ryoichi Ikegami, was serialized in Shogakukan's seinen manga magazine Big Comic Superior from October 9, 2015, to July 22, 2016. Shogakukan collected its chapters in two tankōbon volumes, released from February 29 to August 30, 2016.

=== Volumes ===
No.	Japanese release date	Japanese ISBN
1	February 29, 2016	978-4-09-187467-2
2	August 30, 2016	978-4-09-187819-9
