= Benkei in New York =

Japanese manga

- The original cover of Shogakukan's collected volume of Benkei in New York.

N.Y.の弁慶 (N.Y. no Benkei)
- Genre: Crime fiction
- Manga
- Written by: Jinpachi Mori
- Illustrated by: Jiro Taniguchi
- Published by: Shogakukan
- English publisher: NA: Viz Media
- Magazine: Big Comic Original Zōkan
- English magazine: NA: Pulp
- Original run: 1991 – 1996
- Volumes: 1

Benkei in New York (Japanese: N.Y.の弁慶, Hepburn: N.Y. no Benkei) is a one-volume manga written by Jinpachi Mori and illustrated by Jiro Taniguchi. It is a collection of short stories revolving around a Japanese artist who moves to New York, but secretly works as a hitman in his spare time. It was originally serialized in the Japanese manga magazine Big Comic Original Zōkan by Shogakukan between 1991 and 1996. The manga was serialized in North America by Viz Media in its Pulp magazine in 2000 and later collected in graphic novel format. Critics have praised the series for its uniqueness compared to North American crime fiction as well as its execution of horror.

== Plot ==
"Haggis"
Benkei entices a man to his bar with malt scotch, the same drink he was consuming when he crashed a car to dodge the draft. There, the man is confronted by the son of the woman who was killed while driving the car, and the man is killed in a knife-fight.
"Hook"
Benkei takes a cabaret dancer named Maria home and draws her. Benkei tracks down a man who killed their shipmate on a fishing trawler with a hook. He chases him through a fish market and using a hook, cuts him down the side of his face.
"Throw Back"
Benkei follows a man from Grand Central Station to Central Park for the third day. The two spar using hand-to-hand combat. They continue fighting in the American Museum of Natural History with swords taken from an exhibit and Benkei kills the man.
"The Cry"
Benkei paints a forgery of The Scream for the Italian mafia. However, its sale is used as a setup to kill a subordinate so the boss, Gantino, can expand his operations. Benkei is targeted in the process but escapes. He creates another forgery from memory and meets Gantino, lying that he has the original. Benkei kills Gantino while he gazes at the fake and leaves the original in a museum.
"Sword Fish"
Benkei is invited to Sicily by Troia, a former leading figure of La Cosa Nostra, to forge his collection of European paintings. Sorchi, one of Troia's men, works with Gantino's brother to attack Benkei's car and kidnap Maria. In the resulting negotiation, Sorchi reveals that he wants Troia's paintings and tries to kill them. Benkei uses a swordfish's bill as a weapon but is shot. When he shows the paintings to Sorchi, Troia sets them on fire along with Sorchi. Fatally wounded, Troia dies as Benkei shows him his forgery of Jean-François Millet's painting Maternal Care.
"Necklace"
A man wants Benkei to kill Sophie Gibson, the leader of a drug ring, but Benkei refuses because he feels that the request is dishonest. When the man tries to kill her himself, he is shot. Before he dies, he reveals to Benkei that Gibson and he were engaged lovers from Vermont and asks him to give her a necklace of pearl. Benkei strings the necklace with piano wire and uses it to strangle Sophie.
"Basement"
An architect named Gordon murders his more successful peer and wife, Betty, at their summer home on an island. Benkei visits him to deliver a painting of Betty and the image scares Gordon. Running from Benkei, Gordon hides in the basement which includes a pool designed by Betty. Benkei barricades the man inside while delivering a message from Betty saying "I loved you too much."

== Release ==
The manga was originally serialized in the magazine Big Comic Original Zōkan by Shogakukan between 1991 and 1996. It was collected into one tankōbon volume and released by Shogakukan on April 27, 1996.

The manga has been published in English by Viz Media through its manga magazine Pulp. Its first chapter appeared in the June 2000 issue of the magazine, and the complete series was published in graphic novel format in May 2001.

== Reception ==
As the time of its release by Viz Media, Warren Ellis declared that "Benkei is better than 96% of the crime fiction coming out of America right now." Although he described the stories as "ghoulish", Jason Thompson commented that Taniguchi can depict "the blood and the death in a cool, calm fashion." He also highlighted a battle sequence in the third chapter as "particularly notable" as it is wordless and free of sound-effects. Katherine Dacey of Manga Bookshelf said: "If Benkei's motives and methods are sometimes inscrutable—or downright illogical—the stories still work beautifully, with crack pacing and memorable denouements that can be as deeply unsettling as they are emotionally satisfying".

Scott Green of Ain't It Cool News said that Benkei's modus operandi of artistry was "perfectly executed". Christopher Butcher said that the manga is "darker and dirtier than anything being produced in North America" while praising the tightly written stories and "cinematic style" art.
