= Jaws in Japan =

- Directed by: John Hijiri
- Written by: Yasutoshi Murakawa; Bobby White
- Produced by: Kyôsuke Ueno; Rie Mikami
- Starring: Nomani Takizawa; Airi Nakajima; Megumi Haruno
- Music by: Takayoshi Tarui
- Release date: 21 August 2009
- Running time: 70 minutes
- Country: Japan
- Language: Japanese

Jaws in Japan (later retitled Psycho Shark) is a 2009 Japanese mockbuster horror film directed by John Hijiri and written by Yasutoshi Murakawa, starring Nonami Takizawa, Airi Nakajima, and Megumi Haruno. Despite its title, the film has no connection with the 1975 Steven Spielberg film Jaws in terms of its plot or its production.

== Summary ==
On the coast off of a private beach on a tropical island, a huge shark is waiting for his prey. Young college students Miki and Mai arrive on the island but are unable to find a hotel in which to stay. Both the young women soon find out that something is seriously wrong after they find a hotel and spend some time there happily filming each other, using video cameras offered by the hotel to guests, yet Miki discovers material filmed by a previous occupant. Dream sequences and actual events become intermingled as Miki realizes that a human serial killer is on the loose as well as finding herself and her friend attacked by a gigantic, almost whale-sized shark.

Despite both the movie's Japanese and US titles, the vast majority of the scenes consist of either the girls playing together in bikinis or of them examining materials that have been recorded. Whether or not the killer shark actually exists or is a metaphorical device relating to the human serial killer discovered by Miki in the hotel room recording is left unexplained.

== Release ==
The film was not rated by the Motion Picture Association of America. In both the United Kingdom and the Republic of Ireland, it has a 12A certificate, meaning that it is not recommended that children under the age of twelve watch it unless they are accompanied by an adult. Despite the advertisement related to the film, no nudity and no sex between characters are shown.

== Reception ==
The title's reference to the original Jaws film attracted legal attention, with the creators of the Japanese movie having failed to obtain any sort of permission to use that name. Despite the introduction of the Psycho Shark title later on, the original name appears to have gained some traction in popular culture and has stuck.

The exploitative nature of the movie attracted condemnation from a variety of publications, such as an article in Vanity Fair labeling the "rip-off" film worth being "forgotten".

== See also ==
- List of killer shark films
