= Hikaru Natsumi =

Japanese writer and sex worker

- Born: 1973
- Died: November 4, 2002 (aged 29)
- Occupations: Writer, sex worker

Hikaru Natsumi (菜摘ひかる, Natsumi Hikaru; 1973 – November 4, 2002) was a Japanese writer and sex worker. She is best known for her blog The Sexual Adventures of Hikaru Natsumi (菜摘ひかるの性的冒険), which was published as a book in 1998.

== Biography ==
=== Early life and career ===
Natsumi was born in 1973 in the Kantō region of Japan. While in high school, she contributed writing and manga to manga magazines specializing in adult comics that were edited by Yoshiaki Shioyama. After graduating high school, Natsumi began working as a clerk at a clothing store. She later transitioned to the water trade, alternately working as an erotic masseuse, at image clubs, and in soaplands. She additionally worked as a nude model for erotic books and adult films, though after being arrested for indecent exposure after stripping nude on a street in Shinjuku for a photo shoot in 1996, she retired from modeling.

In the mid-1990s, Natsumi began publishing a blog about her experiences as a sex worker titled The Sexual Adventures of Hikaru Natsumi (菜摘ひかるの性的冒険). The blog was later published as a book by the Japanese publishing house Yosensha in 1998; its success prompted Natsumi to become a full-time author of novels and manga. "Vulgarity Drifting Diary", an English-language column by Natsumi, was published in the American manga magazine Pulp. The column lasted until early 2002. Pulp's team was divided on Natsumi's treatment of vulgarity (ex: fascination with vomit), and was surprised to find that women were less disgusted by it than men.

=== Personal life and death ===
In her writing, Natsumi referenced having once been married to an unnamed husband whom she divorced. She reported having a troubled relationship with her parents, particularly her father.

On November 4, 2002, Natsumi died at the age of 29. The cause of death was not released, beyond that she had been in poor health since mid-2002 and experienced a "sudden change in health". A private funeral was held. In February 2003, a commemorative issue of the literary magazine Bungei was published in Natsumi's memory. Among the contributors to the issue were Rika Kayama, Yukari Fujimoto, Amari Hayashi, and Naito Yamada, the lattermost of whom regularly collaborated with Natsumi as the illustrator on her manga works.

== Works ==
- The Sexual Adventures of Hikaru Natsumi (菜摘ひかるの性的冒険), Yosensha, 1998; republished by Kobunsha in 2000
- Ikebukuro Image Club Diary (池袋イメクラ日記), Futami Shobo, 1998
- Love is Flesh-Colored (恋は肉色), Kobunsha, 2000
- If You Look Up (仰げば尊し), Akita Shoten, 2000
- Hikaru Natsumi: I Want to be a Turtle (菜摘ひかるの私はカメになりたい), Kadokawa Shoten, 2001
- Ecchi Principle (えっち主義), Kadokawa Shoten, 2002
- Dependent Princess (依存姫) (Seikatsusha, 2002)
- "Body Therapy" (ボディ・テラピー) in As You Indulge (耽溺れるままに), multi-author anthology, Tokuma Shoten, 2003
- Naughty Feelings (えっちな気持ち), Kadokawa Shoten, 2003
