= Even a Monkey Can Draw Manga =

Japanese manga series

- First tankōbon volume cover

サルでも描けるまんが教室 (Saru demo egakeru manga kyōshitsu)
- Genre: Comedy, parody
- Manga
- Written by: Koji Aihara; Kentaro Takekuma
- Published by: Shogakukan
- English publisher: NA: Viz Media
- Magazine: Big Comic Spirits
- English magazine: NA: Pulp
- Original run: 1989 – 1991
- Volumes: 3
- Manga

Saruman 2.0
- Written by: Koji Aihara; Kentaro Takekuma
- Published by: Shogakukan
- Magazine: Monthly Ikki
- Original run: October 25, 2007 – May 24, 2008
- Volumes: 1
- icon

Even a Monkey Can Draw Manga (Japanese: サルでも描けるまんが教室, Hepburn: Sarudemo Egakeru Manga Kyōshitsu), also abbreviated as Saruman (サルまん), is a Japanese instructional manga series created by Koji Aihara and Kentaro Takekuma. It was serialized in Shogakukan's seinen manga magazine Big Comic Spirits from 1989 to 1991, with its chapters collected in three tankōbon volumes. The manga was licensed in North America by Viz Media, being serialized in its Pulp magazine from 2001 to 2002; it was also released in a single volume. A second series, titled Saruman 2.0, was serialized in Shogakukan's Monthly Ikki from 2007 to 2008; its chapters were collected in a single volume, released in 2017.

== Overview ==
Even a Monkey Can Draw Manga is a how-to gag manga presented in the form of a instructional guide on manga creation. It follows two young men who aspire to become manga artists while harboring ambitions of dominating Japan. The work incorporates extensive parody and analysis of manga conventions.

== Publication ==
Created by Koji Aihara and Kentaro Takekuma, Even a Monkey Can Draw Manga was serialized in Shogakukan's seinen manga magazine Big Comic Spirits from 1989 to 1991. Shogakukan collected its chapters in three tankōbon volumes, released from November 1990 to June 1992. It was republished in two wideban volumes, under the title Saruman (サルまん), on July 19, 1997. Two "21st Century Collector's Edition" volumes were released on August 28, 2006.

In North America, the series was published in Viz Media's Pulp magazine from May 2001 to August 2002. Viz Media only released a collected volume on November 6, 2002.

Another series, titled Saruman 2.0 (サルまん2.0), was serialized in Shogakukan's Monthly Ikki from October 25, 2007, to May 24, 2008. (Note: It was serialized until the magazine's July 2008 issue, released on May 24 of that same year.) A collected volume was released by Shogakukan Creative, almost ten years after the manga's first publication, on June 26, 2017.

== Reception ==
Pat King of Animefringe praised the manga as an "excellent parody of the manga industry" and noted that its artwork "would be right at home in classic issues of Mad Magazine". Johanna Draper Carlson of Comics Worth Reading described the adult content as "vulgar but funny", citing its "nudity and various scatological gags". Carlo Santos of Anime News Network commended the work for its "rundown of every major genre, by demographic" and considered it superior to other "How-to Art" books.

Canadian cartoonist and writer Bryan Lee O'Malley cited the book as a major influence on the art style of his Scott Pilgrim graphic novel series.
