= Ichi the Killer (film) =

2001 film by Takashi Miike

- Theatrical release poster
- Directed by: Takashi Miike
- Screenplay by: Sakichi Satō
- Based on: Ichi the Killer by Hideo Yamamoto
- Produced by: Akiko Funatsu; Dai Miyazaki
- Starring: Tadanobu Asano; Nao Omori; Shinya Tsukamoto; Alien Sun; Susumu Terajima; Shun Sugata; Toru Tezuka; Yoshiki Arizono; Kee; Satoshi Niizuma; Suzuki Matsuo; Jun Kunimura; Sabu
- Cinematography: Hideo Yamamoto
- Edited by: Yasushi Shimamura
- Music by: Karera Musication; Seiichi Yamamoto
- Production companies: Omega Micott, Inc.
- Distributed by: Prénom H Co, Ltd. (Japan); Media Blasters (United States)
- Release dates: 14 September 2001 (TIFF); 22 December 2001 (Japan)
- Running time: 130 minutes
- Country: Japan
- Languages: Japanese; English; Cantonese

Ichi the Killer (Japanese: 殺し屋1, romanized: Koroshiya Ichi, lit. 'Hitman One') is a 2001 Japanese yakuza splatter film directed by Takashi Miike, written by Sakichi Sato, and starring Tadanobu Asano and Nao Omori. Based on Hideo Yamamoto's manga series of the same name, its plot follows a psychologically damaged man who is manipulated into assaulting or killing rival faction members of feuding yakuza gangs while being pursued by a sadomasochistic enforcer.

The film has garnered controversy due to its graphic depictions of violence and cruelty and was subject to censorship in several countries.

== Plot ==
A man named Ichi spies from a balcony, masturbating as he watches a pimp assault a prostitute. When discovered, he flees. Soon after, the sadistic yakuza boss Anjo is murdered. A cleaning crew led by Jijii disposes of the body and frames Ichi for the killing. Kakihara, Anjo's sadomasochistic lieutenant, inspects the spotless crime scene and assumes Anjo absconded with clan funds. He interrogates Karen, Anjo's girlfriend, and pursues false leads, eventually torturing Suzuki, a rival clansman. When Suzuki proves innocent, Kakihara cuts off his own tongue as atonement.

Kakihara later captures Kano, a member of the cleaning crew, who reveals Ichi's role in Anjo's death and warns that Kakihara is now a target. Meanwhile, Ichi returns to the pimp's balcony, witnessing another assault on Sailor, a prostitute he frequents. He kills the pimp but then turns on Sailor, murdering her when she resists.

Exiled from the yakuza, Kakihara takes the Anjo clan with him. Suzuki offers Jijii a bounty for Kakihara's death, unaware that Jijii manipulates the conflict, using Ichi as his weapon. Ichi, ordinarily timid, becomes homicidal when enraged, a trait Jijii exploits by implanting false memories, including a fabricated high school rape.

Ichi rescues Takeshi, the son of Kakihara's henchman Kaneko, from bullies. Later, Jijii provokes Ichi into slaughtering Anjo clan members in an apartment. Kaneko, recognizing Ichi from earlier, saves him from an attacker, recalling his own past rescue by the yakuza.

Kakihara employs corrupt twin detectives, Jirō and Saburō, to track down Myu-Myu, a prostitute linked to Jijii's associate Ryu Long. After Long escapes the detectives, Kakihara captures and tortures him for information. Meanwhile, Jijii manipulates Karen into seducing Ichi by posing as the woman from his false memory. Confused by her claims, Ichi kills her. Jijii then lures Kakihara into a confrontation, killing Takayama, one of Kakihara's men, before Ichi arrives and slays Jirō and Saburō.

The final confrontation unfolds on a rooftop, where Ichi—believing Kaneko is his brother due to Jijii's psychological manipulation—slits his throat in front of Takeshi. The traumatized boy attacks Ichi, triggering a mental breakdown. Kakihara, overwhelmed by Ichi's screams, impales his own ears with skewers, hallucinating Ichi decapitating Takeshi and attacking him. In his delusion, Ichi kills Kakihara, though in reality, Kakihara dies from self-inflicted wounds.

Years later, Jijii's corpse is found hanging in a park. A young man resembling Takeshi departs with a group of children, leaving the fate of the cycle of violence unresolved.

== Cast ==
- Tadanobu Asano as Masao Kakihara, a yakuza enforcer who worked for Anjo.
- Nao Omori as Ichi, a psychotic and sexually repressed man who becomes reflexively murderous when aroused.
- Shinya Tsukamoto as Jijii, Ichi's mysterious handler responsible for the murders he commits
- Alien Sun as Karen, an English-speaking Zainichi Chinese prostitute who is a friend of Jijii and ex-girlfriend of the sadistic yakuza boss, Anjo.
- Sabu as Kaneko, one of Kakihara's henchmen
- Susumu Terajima as Suzuki, a yakuza gangster who is a member of the notorious Funaki clan
- Shun Sugata as Takayama
- Toru Tezuka as Fujiwara
- Yoshiki Arizono as Nakazawa
- Kee as Ryu Long, a Zainichi Chinese gangster and member of Jijii's expert cleaning crew and gang
- Satoshi Niizuma as Inoue
- Suzuki Matsuo as Jirō & Saburō, a pair of twin brothers and corrupt detectives from Tokyo Metropolitan Police Department
- Jun Kunimura as Funaki, the head of the powerful Funaki clan, a notorious yakuza syndicate
- Moro Morooka as Coffee Shop Manager
- Mai Goto as Sailor, a prostitute who is object of desire of Ichi
- Rio Aoki as Miyuki ("Myu-Myu"), a prostitute connected with Ryu Long
- Houka Kinoshita as Sailor's lover
- Hiroshi Kobayashi as Takeshi, Kaneko's young son
- Noko Morishita as Pub patron
- Setchin Kawaya as Pub proprietor
- Yuki Kazamatsuri as Yakuza Girl
- Sakichi Satō as Man kicking Ichi

== Production ==
The soundtrack was written and produced by Karera Musication, a side project of the Japanese band Boredoms, under the direction of ex-guitarist Seiichi Yamamoto and percussionist/band leader Yoshimi P-We.

== Themes ==
Film journalist Tom Mes has suggested that the film is in fact a very sophisticated assessment of violence and its relation to the media and implicating the audience. He writes that "It's a paradox, but Ichi the Killer, a film that sets new boundaries in the portrayal of violence and bloodshed, takes a strongly critical stance towards the portrayal and the consumption of the violent image. However, it does so without ever taking a moral stance towards either the portrayal or the consumption, thus circumventing any accusations of hypocrisy on the part of the director. Miike does not moralise or chastise, but provokes the audience into questioning their own attitudes towards viewing images of violence. He steers them into a direction but leaves it up to them to draw their own conclusion".

Mes is also very critical of the edits made to the film. He argues that "The film as a whole is a completely cohesive unity, in that all of its parts are absolutely crucial to the functioning of the whole. Any attempt at censorship or toning down the violence will have the opposite effect and will in fact make the film more exploitative and thereby undermine its critical stance. Excising scenes of violence, particularly the 'painful' scenes, will harm the symbiosis between the 'playful' and the 'painful' violence, which forms the basis for Miike's critical approach".

== Release ==
The film had its world premiere in the Midnight Madness section at the 2001 Toronto International Film Festival on 14 September 2001. It was released in Japan on 22 December 2001.

As a publicity gimmick, barf bags were received by viewers out at the Toronto International Film Festival (TIFF) to those attending the midnight screening of this movie. Similar bags were given during the Stockholm International Film Festival. Reportedly, watching this film caused one viewer to throw up and another to faint. The British Board of Film Classification refused the release of the uncut film in the United Kingdom, citing "scenes of mutilated, raped or savagely beaten women or of sexual pleasure from violence." A compulsory cut of three minutes and fifteen seconds of content was required for the film's release; the cut version was passed with an 18 certificate. For the Hong Kong release, sixteen minutes and 59 seconds were cut. The movie has been banned outright in Norway and Malaysia, and banned for distribution in Germany.

In 2018, a digital restoration of the film was made by L'Immagine Ritrovata. The first public screening was at the HKIFF42.Well Go USA Entertainment released the restoration on March 20, 2018.

The film had special screening in the NYAFF 25th Anniversary Rediscoveries section of the 25th New York Asian Film Festival on 18 July 2026 as part of the 25th anniversary of the festival.

== Reception ==
On Rotten Tomatoes, the film holds an approval rating of 65% based on 40 reviews, with a weighted average rating of 6.20/10. The website's critical consensus reads, "Ichi The Killer is a thoroughly shocking gorefest that will surely entertain those with strong stomachs and a penchant for brutal violence." Metacritic reports a score of 55 out of 100 based on 10 critics, indicating "mixed or average reviews".

Some critics praised Miike's stylish and narrative approach. Tanner Tafelski of The Village Voice noted, "Miike layers a blood-stained commentary on a toxic world in which men offer protection to men but really end up dooming them to exist within a spasmodic, shambolic, and hypermasculine sphere of violence."

Other critics were more critical of the film's extreme violence and found the film inconsistent. Dennis Harvey said for Variety, "Even hardy gonzo-cinema auds will likely find the hectic pace overstimulating to the point of numbed-out tedium."

Slant Magazine named Nao Omori's role one the "15 Famous Movie Psychopaths".

== Prequel ==
The film was followed by a prequel, 1-Ichi. Nao Omori reprises his role in the prequel, playing a younger version of Ichi.

== See also ==
- List of cult films
- Prostitution in Japan
