= Yasutoshi Murakawa =

Japanese screenwriter

- Born: May 31, 1971 (age 55); Japan
- Occupation: Screenwriter

Yasutoshi Murakawa (村川 康敏, Yasutoshi Murakawa; born May 31, 1971) is a Japanese screenwriter.

== Career ==
He studied under Hiroshi Kashiwabara, Takuya Nishioka, and Yumiko Inoue, before working as a screenwriter. He is a member of the Japan Writers Guild.

== Filmography ==
=== Screenplay ===
- OneChanbara (2008)
- Wangan Midnight (2009)
- Psycho Shark (2009)

=== Teleplay ===
- Sagishi Ririko (2009)

=== Anime ===
- Golgo 13 (2009)
- Tegamibachi (2010)
- Detective Conan (2012-)
