= Kentaro Takekuma =

Japanese manga artist

Kentaro Takekuma (竹熊 健太郎, Takekuma Kentarō) is a Japanese manga artist.

He is one of the authors of Even a Monkey Can Draw Manga. He is also the story writer of Super Mario Adventures.
