= Hideo Yamamoto =

Japanese manga artist

- Born: June 23, 1968 (age 58); Tokorozawa, Saitama, Japan
- Occupation: Manga artist
- Known for: Ichi the Killer; Homunculus

Hideo Yamamoto (山本英夫, Yamamoto Hideo) is a Japanese manga artist. He is best known as the creator of the manga series Ichi the Killer, which was adapted into a live-action film by Takashi Miike in 2001, and Homunculus.

Recurring themes in his manga are crime, sexual deviations, and the human mind.

== Biography ==
Hideo Yamamoto received the "Tetsuya Chiba Award", given to promising young manga creators in 1988. After resigning from the post of assistant of a popular seinen manga artist, Kenshi Hirokane, he made his professional debut by drawing SHEEP (written by Masahiko Takasho) for Weekly Young Sunday in 1989.

== Works ==
- Sheep, 1989
- Okama Report, 1989–1991
- Voyeur (Nozokiya), 1992
- Another One Bites The Dust (illustrated by Koshiba Tetsuya)
- Voyeurs, Inc. (Shin Nozokiya), 1993–1997
- Ichi the Killer, 1998–2001
- Homunculus, 2003–2011
- Part-Time Detective 2 (2004) (cinematographer)
- Yume Onna, 2013 (illustrated by Hiroya Oku)
- Hikari-Man, 2014–2020
- Adam and Eve, 2015–2016 (illustrated by Ryoichi Ikegami)
