= Sakichi Sato =

Japanese film director, screenwriter and actor

- Born: May 12, 1964 (age 62); Japan
- Occupations: Actor, director, screenwriter
- Known for: Kill Bill: Volume 1

Sakichi Sato (佐藤 佐吉, Satō Sakichi; born May 12, 1964) is a Japanese actor, director, and screenwriter.

== Career ==
He has written several screenplay adaptations of manga series including Tokyo Zombie, Ichi The Killer, and Gozu. He also directed Miss Boys about cross-dressing schoolboys. In the West, he played Charlie Brown in Quentin Tarantino's 2003 film Kill Bill: Volume 1.

== Filmography ==
=== Director or writer ===
Year	Title	Role	Ref.
2001	Ichi the Killer	Writer	
2003	Gozu	Writer	
2005	Tokyo Zombie	Director, writer	
2010	Insect Detective Yoshimi Yoshida	Director	
2011	Miss Boys! Part 1	Director	
2012	Miss Boys! Part 2	Director	
2014	Tokyo Slaves	Director, writer	
2026	The Chain of Roses	Director	

=== Actor ===
Year	Title	Role	Ref.
2001	Ichi The Killer	Man Kicking Ichi	
2002	Bright Future		
2003	Gozu	Coffee Shop Manager	
2003	Last Life in the Universe	Yakuza	
2003	Kill Bill: Volume 1	Charlie Brown	
2004	Part-Time Detective 2	Charlie Brown	
2004	Kill Bill: Volume 2	Charlie Brown	
2004	Kill Bill: The Whole Bloody Affair	Charlie Brown	
2008	Heibon Ponch	Aki Mashima	
2011	Tokyo Playboy Club	Matsunosuke	
