= Koji Aihara =

Japanese manga artist from Hokkaido

Koji Aihara 相原 コージ
- Born: May 3, 1963 (age 63) Noboribetsu, Hokkaido
- Area: Manga artist
- Notable works: Katte ni Shirokuma Koojien

Koji Aihara (相原 コージ, Aihara Kōji) is a Japanese manga artist from Hokkaido.

Aihara grew up reading the works of Osamu Tezuka. He made his debut with Hachigatsu no Nureta Pantsu in 1983, which ran in Weekly Manga Action Magazine. He is one of the authors of Even a Monkey Can Draw Manga, a satiric look at the manga industry. Aihara's other best-known works include Bunka Jinrui Gag, Koojien, Mujina and Manka. Manka has been described as being similar to tanka in that it shows the breadth of human emotion within the short space of a yonkoma. He has also drawn a yonkoma parody of a Japanese dictionary. His work has been described as breaking new ground for themes in comedic manga, and as showing "meticulous detail". He also designed the characters for the RPG video games Maka Maka and Idea no Hi (scenario and character design draft).

== Works ==
=== Manga ===
- Hachigatsu no Nureta Pantsu
- Katte ni Shirokuma
- Even a Monkey Can Draw Manga
- Bunka Jinrui Gag
- Koojien
- Mujina
- Manka
- Z ~Zed~

=== Video games ===
- Maka Maka
- Day of the Idea
