= Dororo (disambiguation) =

The term Dororo may mean:

- Dororo, a 1967 manga by Osamu Tezuka
  - Dororo (1969 TV series), a 1969 anime series based on the manga
  - Dororo (2019 TV series), a 2019 anime series based on the manga
  - Dororo (film), a 2007 live action film based on the manga
  - Blood Will Tell, known in Japanese as Dororo, a 2004 video game based on the manga
  - "Dororo", theme song for 2019 anime series Dororo by Asian Kung-Fu Generation
- Lance Corporal Dororo, a ninja from the anime/manga series Sgt. Frog
- Dororo language
