= List of Dororo (2019 TV series) episodes =

Dororo is a Japanese anime television series based on Osamu Tezuka's manga series of the same name. The 24-episode series was broadcast from January 7 to June 24, 2019, on Tokyo MX, BS11, and Jidaieki Senmon Channel, and was streamed exclusively worldwide on Amazon Prime Video. The episodes were collected in two Blu-ray volumes released in Japan on May 22 and August 21, 2019.

Kazuhiro Furuhashi directs the series, with Yasuko Kobayashi handling series composition, Satoshi Iwataki handling character designs, and Yoshihiro Ike composing the music. Twin Engine produces the series. The soundtrack of the series was released on August 14, 2019, in two different editions. A guidebook featuring Hiroyuki Asada's art was released in Japan on August 2, 2019.

The series was licensed by Sentai Filmworks for an English release in March 2021. Sentai's deal includes distribution rights for the United States, Canada, United Kingdom, Australia, New Zealand, South Africa, Latin America, Spain, Portugal, the Netherlands, and Nordic and Scandinavian countries. The Blu-ray disk of the series was released by Sentai on June 29, 2021. Madman Entertainment released it in Australia on October 6, 2021.

== Episode list ==
No.	Title	Directed by	Written by	Original release date
1	"The Story of Daigo"; Transliteration: "Daigo no Maki" (Japanese: 醍醐の巻)	Kazuhiro Furuhashi	Yasuko Kobayashi	January 7, 2019
As Lord Kagemitsu Daigo waits for his wife Nuinokata to give birth, he recalls the time he made a pact with the twelve demons in the Hall of Hell, prepared to tread the path of evil in exchange for power. When his first son is born, the demons extract their payment: the child is born without limbs, facial features, or skin. The baby is set adrift in the river and left to its fate. Sixteen years later, he is now a young man, travelling alone, wearing prosthesis made by Dr. Jukai. While hunting a sludge-like demon Deiki, he encounters Dororo, a young petty-thief being beaten by three men who Dororo cheated out of their goods. The demon attacks and devours the men, but the youth destroys it with blades inside his prosthetic arms. Following the death of the demon, the youth's missing skin reappears, and a demon statue in the Hall of Hell is split by lightning. Meanwhile, back in Ishikawa, Kagemitsu Daigo's second son Tahōmaru returns home from hunting, however Nuinokata still misses her first son.
2	"The Story of Bandai"; Transliteration: "Bandai no Maki" (Japanese: 万代の巻)	Kōichi Hatsumi	Yasuko Kobayashi	January 14, 2019
Dororo accompanies the young man, who seems to be unable to see, hear, or talk. However, he has excellent sword skills, super-human strength, and the ability to detect friendly or unfriendly beings by the color of their souls. Dororo takes the young man to a village run by a beautiful woman named Bandai and offers to slay a local monster which rings a pilgrim bell, for a fee. While there, they meet the blind monk known as Biwa-Hōshi, who can also detect people's souls. They discover Bandai is actually a demon who has been eating travelers, and the young man slays her. The monster reappears, ringing its bell, and a villager explains it is the spirit of the first being the villagers killed. The young man reveals his name, Hyakkimaru, to Dororo and the monk . As Bandai's Statue in the Hall of Hell gets struck by lightning, Hyakkimaru regains his central nervous system, thus regaining the ability to feel pain. Meanwhile Kagemitsu Daigo is told the Sakai Clan appears to be preparing for war.
3	"The Story of Jukai"; Transliteration: "Jukai no Maki" (Japanese: 寿海の巻)	Fumihiro Yoshimura	Kiyoko Yoshimura	January 21, 2019
The story is told of Jukai-sensei, a doctor who not only healed the sick, but made prostheses for those who had lost limbs in accidents or war. He once worked for Lord Shiba, crucifying wounded enemies until the day his loved one was killed by Shiba's soldiers, and he leaped into the sea. He was rescued by foreigners and learned how to make prosthesis. One day, he found Lord Kagemitsu Daigo's abandoned and deformed infant on a riverbank. He took the child home and made special prostheses for him so he could move about and appear normal. Six years later, Jukai gave him the name Hyakkimaru. After Hyakkimaru killed a lizard demon and his right leg was magically returned to him, Jukai realized that although the boy attracted demons, his body parts had probably been stolen by demons. Jukai inserted swords into Hyakkimaru’s prosthetic arms before the young man left to travel the land alone. Back in the present, Hyakkimaru awakens from his sleep and tests his newly acquired ability to feel pain from killing the demon Bandai.
4	"The Story of the Cursed Sword"; Transliteration: "Yōtō no Maki" (Japanese: 妖刀の巻)	Takao Suzuki	Akira Kindaichi	January 28, 2019
Dororo chats with the girl Osushi while Hyakkimaru stands outside, experiencing the feeling of rain for the first time. Suddenly, Hyakkimaru detects a demon sword and rushes off. He encounters a man wielding the sword and only manages to defeat him by trapping the sword in his prosthetic leg. Dororo goes to retrieve the leg, but is pulled back to its owner when he touches the sword, Osushi's brother Tanosuke. Osushi takes her brother home but he is only interested in regaining the sword. Tanosuke recalls how he was given the demon sword Nihiru (似蛭), and how it changed his life in its eternal thirst for blood. Meanwhile, Hyakkimaru disarms Dororo, but Tanosuke seizes the sword again and attacks Hyakkimaru. This time Hyakkimaru kills Tanosuke and breaks Nihiru, which returns Hyakkimaru's ears to him. As his sense of sound returns to him, Hyakkimaru is overwhelmed by the sounds of a distraught Osushi, mourning the death of her brother.
5	"The Story of the Moriko Song: Part 1"; Transliteration: "Moriko Uta no Maki-jō" (Japanese: 守小唄の巻・上)	Teruyuki Omine	Yasuko Kobayashi	February 4, 2019
Hyakkimaru is having difficulty adjusting to his new hearing when he is attacked by a huge bird-like monster and is only saved by the appearance of the Biwa-Hōshi. The priest tells them they are in Sakai territory, which are preparing to march on the Daigo army. The next morning, Hyakkimaru encounters Mio, a young woman singing a beautiful song, but he collapses from his wounds. The travelers stay with Mio and a group of orphaned children at an abandoned temple while Mio works at night serving the Sakai troops as a prostitute. Meanwhile, the Biwa-Hōshi finds a better place for them, however it is inhabited by a demon. Despite his wounds still healing, Hyakkimaru goes to fight it. The Biwa-Hōshi is concerned; Hyakkimaru's white aura is starting to show hints of demon red. They encounter the antlion larvae-like demon Arijigoku (蟻地獄), which bites off the lower half of Hyakkimaru's real leg, leaving him screaming in agony. That night, Mio leaves to service Daigo men in an attempt to make more money, and Dororo discovers the type of work she does.
6	"The Story of the Moriko Song: Part 2"; Transliteration: "Moriko Uta no Maki-ge" (Japanese: 守小唄の巻・下)	Kōichi Hatsumi	Yasuko Kobayashi	February 11, 2019
The Biwa-Hōshi heads back to Mio's camp with Hyakkimaru. His leg is half gone but his voice has returned. Meanwhile, Dororo questions the other children about the type of work Mio does, but they are unaware. Hyakkimaru slowly adjusts to using his hearing and his voice with the help of Mio. They become drawn to each other and the red in his soul fades. Although only partially recovered, Hyakkimaru returns to kill the Arijigoku demon, this time with some swords the children recovered from the battlefield. He succeeds in killing the demon and his leg heals. However, when he and Dororo return to the temple, they find Mio mortally wounded and Daigo troops murdering the orphans because they believe Mio is a Sakai spy. Enraged by the attack on Mio, Hyakkimaru goes berserk, slaughtering all the Daigo troops until Dororo intervenes, fearing Hyakkimaru may become a demon himself. Later, Dororo finds some precious seed rice in Mio's hand, taken from the samurai she so despised to start her farm. After burying the dead, Hyakkimaru and Dororo continue their travels.
7	"The Story of the Jorogumo Silk Spider"; Transliteration: "Jorōgumo no Maki" (Japanese: 絡新婦の巻)	Fumihiro Yoshimura	Shigeru Murakoshi	February 18, 2019
Hyakkimaru and Dororo come across the female spider-like demon Jorogumo, who has captured a man. Hyakkimaru attacks the demon and wounds her, but she escapes. The travelers enter a nearby village which has a problem with men disappearing at night. The next day, the kindly Yajiro heads out on a trail and finds the ailing demon, who appears in the form of a beautiful woman. He takes her home, and after feeding her some ohagi, gives her the name "Ohagi" and leaves for work at the lord's quarry. Although she is hungry, Ohagi resists eating Yajiro because of his kind nature. Yajiro offers to guide the ailing Ohagi out of the village, and it is revealed local men have not been captured or killed, but that Yajiro has been helping them flee from the oppressive local Lord. Yajiro and Ohagi encounter Hyakkimaru, who attacks Ohagi, but she escapes with Yajiro. Yajiro takes Ohagi to a secret passage in the mountain. However, they are attacked by the lord's troops and Yajiro is wounded. Enraged, Ohagi attacks and defeats the troops, but this attracts Hyakkimaru to her. As Hyakkimaru and Ohagi prepare to fight to the death she worries about Yajiro and the red demon color of her soul fades, so Hyakkimaru withdraws and lets her leave with Yajiro.
8	"The Story of Saru"; Transliteration: "Saru no Maki" (Japanese: さるの巻)	Teruyuki Omine	Akira Kindaichi	February 25, 2019
A dark cloud containing the demon Nokosaregumo appears over a village, and the villagers hurriedly prepare a woman as a sacrificial bride to appease it. As Hyakkimaru and Dororo see the bridal parade travelling up the mountain, Saru, a wild boy, tries to stop the sacrifice. After Saru tells them the story of Nokosaregumo and that he considers the sacrifice his sister, Dororo and Hyakkimaru agree to exterminate the demon. A dark cloud envelops them and Nokosaregumo appears as a large centipede. However, Hyakkimaru is unable to differentiate the demon from the cloud as they both show red to his vision, and it swallows the woman. Dororo and Saru devise a plan to create an explosion using the sulfurous gases emitted by the mountain, which sets the demon ablaze but has little effect. Dororo then jumps on Nokosaregumo's head and calls to Hyakkimaru, enabling him to locate and attack the centipede by sound, destroying it. The dark cloud dissipates and Hyakkimaru, Dororo, and the woman, who is still alive from being swallowed whole, fall into a spring. Saru is relieved to find his sister and agrees to move into the village with her. Hyakkimaru regains his sense of smell and, for the first time, addresses Dororo by name.
9	"The Story of the Merciless"; Transliteration: "Muzanchō no Maki" (Japanese: 無残帳の巻)	Hiromichi Matano	Shigeru Murakoshi	March 4, 2019
Dororo falls ill with fever, and Hyakkimaru takes him to a temple for treatment. Delirious, Dororo sees some blood-red red spider lily flowers and it triggers memories of the past with his mother, Ojiya, and his father, Hibukuro. Hibukuro was the principled leader of a group of bandits, composed of former farmers, which regularly raided samurai as retribution for their loss and suffering. One day, Itachi, his second-in-command, suggested they raid a battle-weary group of Yanagimoto, but it was a trap set by Itachi, who had decided it would be more profitable to work for a samurai lord. He took Hibukuro's surviving men and crippled Hibukuro's legs. The family were left to raid bodies on the battlefield for supplies where Hibukuro said the color of red spider lilies may come from those who died in battle. One day, they encounter a group of samurai burning down a village. Hibukuro is recognized and ultimately killed after a fierce fight. Dororo and Ojiya survive by foraging for food, but Ojiya eventually dies of starvation in a field of red spider lilies. Back in the present, Dororo recovers, but the priestess reveals to Hyakkimaru Dororo is actually female, calling Dororo ‘young girl’ after removing her clothes to wash them. Meanwhile, Kagemitsu Daigo is told Hyakkimaru may be alive from a survivor of the attack on Mio's camp.
10	"The Story of Tahōmaru"; Transliteration: "Tahōmaru no Maki" (Japanese: 多宝丸の巻)	Yūki Nishihata	Akira Kindaichi	March 11, 2019
Bakemonogani, a crab-like monster, devours a man after destroying his boat. Meanwhile, the drought in the Daigo lands worsens and Lord Kagemitsu is advised of the Asakura Clan gathering on their border. He visits the temple and finds more demon statues destroyed, and the demons inform him Hyakkimaru is still alive and slowly retrieving the stolen pieces of his body. Kagemitsu's son Tahōmaru discovers his father is searching for a baby. Later, Tahōmaru and his two bodyguards, Mutsu and Hyogo, encounter a village where they speak of a monster in the lake which eats fishermen. He leads a group of villagers in their boats onto the lake and attacks and damages the monster, but it is too fierce, and they are forced to retreat. Tahōmaru then has the villagers construct a trap, intending to lure the monster into a shallow channel where the water can be drained out. The plan works, and Tahōmaru, Mutsu, and Hyogo attack it together. However, the monster fights back and almost devours Hyogo, but at the last minute Hyakkimaru arrives and slays it. Tahōmaru is left wondering who the stranger is.
11	"The Story of Banmon: Part 1"; Transliteration: "Banmon no Maki-jō" (Japanese: ばんもんの巻・上)	Fumihiro Yoshimura	Kiyoko Yoshimura	March 18, 2019
Tahōmaru learns Hyakkimaru's name as the two travelers arrive in the Daigo capital. There, they see a play depicting Kagemitsu Daigo as a great slayer of demons, protected by the Goddess of Mercy. The Biwa-Hōshi seeks the truth at the Hall of Hell while Hyakkimaru and Dororo visit the remnants of Fort Banmon. It was built by Daigo on the site of a village he destroyed and is supposedly cursed by a demon. They find remnants of a timber wall where the Asakura pin bodies of their enemies with arrows. They encounter a young boy, Sukeroku, who wishes to cross to the Asakura side and rejoin his family. Meanwhile, Tahōmaru's bodyguards report the incident with Hyakkimaru to Kagemitsu Daigo, who realizes his son is alive, and decides to kill him and maintain the prosperity of his domain, ignoring his wife's pleas. Tahōmaru overhears their exchange and later comes across a demented woman who was present at Hyakkimaru's birth. She tells him how the demons "ate everything" but left the boy alive. Night falls at Banmon and a kyūbi no kitsune (nine-tailed fox demon) (九尾の狐) appears. While it attacks Hyakkimaru, Sukeroku uses the distraction to pass the wall with Dororo in pursuit, however they are captured by Asakura sentries. The demon is eventually chased off by the arrows of a squadron led by Kagemitsu Daigo himself, who then approaches Hyakkimaru.
12	"The Story of Banmon: Part 2"; Transliteration: "Banmon no Maki-ge" (Japanese: ばんもんの巻・下)	Kana Kawana	Yasuko Kobayashi	March 25, 2019
Hyakkimaru does not recognize his father and is confused when he sees demonic red in Kagemitsu Daigo's soul. Kagemitsu orders his archers to fire at Hyakkimaru, who flees. Meanwhile, Dororo and Sukeroku are held in an Asakura prison with other Daigo prisoners but Dororo manages to escape. In the Kagemitsu compound, Tahōmaru confronts Nuinokata about his brother's fate, but Kagemitsu explains the bargain he made with the demons to save their land. Hyakkimaru appears and is seen by Nuinokata and Tahōmaru, but Kagemitsu orders him killed. Tahōmaru is horrified, but Kagemitsu asks Tahōmaru if he would be willing to sacrifice the land to save his brother. The Asakura start to kill their prisoners at the Banmon, to provoke a war and the Daigo army charges forward, attracting the fox demon. Lord Kagemitsu arrives with his army and Tahōmaru, who has reluctantly accepted his father's decision and attacks Hyakkimaru. Hyakkimaru breaks Tahōmaru's sword and damages his right eye, then kills the demon, which is sucked into the Banmon. Nuinokata arrives and begs forgiveness for her complicity in Kagemitsu's bargain. She then stabs herself and her sacrifice causes her Goddess of Mercy statue to collapse the Banmon. Survivors of Sukeroku's village arrive and Sukeroku is reunited with his mother. The Biwa-Hōshi picks up Nuinokata's small, headless wooden statue of the Goddess of Mercy (which sacrificed its own head at Hyakkimaru's birth so the child would not lose his head in his father's bargain with the demons), and its gentle green aura fades.
13	"The Story of the Blank-faced Buddha"; Transliteration: "Hakumen Fudō no Maki" (Japanese: 白面不動の巻)	Masami Hata; Takuo Suzuki	Shigeru Murakoshi	April 8, 2019
Hyakkimaru continues his search for demons while Dororo tries to convince him to visit an onsen. Later, Dororo encounters a woman called Okaka who looks like her mother, near Hakumenfudo (白面不動, Hakumen Fudō), a faceless Buddha statue at a waterfall. He introduces Hyakkimaru and Okaka, who tells the story of a sculptor who carved the Buddha statue but died before completing the face. As Dororo falls into a drugged sleep, Okaka finishes the story of how a demon inhabited the statue, but wanted a face. It revived the sculptor as Okaka, with the ability to change her appearance and voice, to bring human offerings so it could take their faces. Okaka drags Hyakkimaru to the waterfall, but he revives and starts to fight Hakumenfudo. Okaka uses the demon's power to immobilize Hyakkimaru, but Dororo implores her to spare him. Okaka's heart is softened by Dororo's pleas, and she allows herself to be wounded by Hakumenfudo's sword, giving Hyakkimaru the opportunity to attack and destroy the demon statue and Okaka disintegrates. Later, Hyakkimaru and Dororo visit an onsen where they encounter the Biwa-Hōshi and other children who see a map which appears on Dororo's back. Nuinokata is shown to have survived her suicide attempt, but Tahōmaru has been blinded in his right eye.
14	"The Story of Sabame"; Transliteration: "Saba-Me no Maki" (Japanese: 鯖目の巻)	Hisatoshi Shimizu	Kiyoko Yoshimura	April 15, 2019
In a flashback, Dororo's father, the bandit Hibukuro, drew a part of a map of the location to his hidden money onto the back of his wife, Ojiya, and the rest on Dororo's back, so they could retrieve it together later. Dororo memorized the map on her mother's back before she died. In the present, the Biwa-Hōshi and Hyakkimaru realize the map appears when Dororo's back heats up, which the Biwa-Hōshi says gives her some choices in life. Hyakkimaru continues his search for demons, unconcerned even when a huge baby-like monster grabs Dororo. They arrive at a burned-out temple and the monster disappears as they encounter Sabame, the lord of the land, carrying a flower offering to the spirit who inhabits the site. He invites them to stay at his home, where he says the temple housed a nunnery which exploited children before it was struck by lightning and destroyed, killing everyone inside. That night, the travelers are attacked by a caterpillar-like monster, but when Hyakkimaru wounds it, a huge moth-like demon, Maimai'Onba (マイマイオンバ) appears and carries it away. The moth lands near Sabame and transforms into a white-haired woman. After she tells Sabame the food he provided for her children was too strong, he consoles her and promises to protect her and her children.
15	"The Story of the Scene from Hell"; Transliteration: "Jigokuhen no Maki" (Japanese: 地獄変の巻)	Osamu Kobayashi	Kiyoko Yoshimura	April 22, 2019
Dororo visits Sabame's prosperous village, where everyone seems happy. She finds a rice storehouse deep in the forest but is pushed into the basement by the villagers. It is filled with the caterpillar monsters, which menace Dororo, but the baby monster returns to save her. The monster bursts open, releasing the spirits of the children from the temple which Sabame and the villagers had fed to Maimai'Onba after burning it down. Outside the village, Sabame tells Hyakkimaru how he accepted the Maimai'Onba, who fed on marauding samurai and beasts to protect the village, and then took her as his wife. The Maimai'Onba moths emerge from their chrysalides and attack Hyakkimaru, who fiercely fights back. However, the last one destroys Hyakkimaru's prosthetic leg and then sacrifices itself to set fire to the village. Meanwhile, Dororo burns down the storehouse, destroying the caterpillars and the village's rice supplies, causing the villagers to fight among themselves over the remaining food. Hyakkimaru finds and kills the original Maimai'Onba, which returns his spinal column to him. He and Dororo walk back through Sabame's burned out village where many villagers lie dead, including Sabame. Dororo wonders if they did the right thing but Hyakkimaru states his only concern is killing demons. Dororo and Hyakkimaru walk separate ways, but Itachi and his men find Dororo. Itachi has half of the map from Ojiya's back and demands to see Dororo's half.
16	"The Story of Shiranui"; Transliteration: "Shiranui no Maki" (Japanese: しらぬいの巻)	Takafumi Ishida	Akira Kindaichi	April 29, 2019
Dororo denies knowledge of a map, but Itachi and his men take her with them, believing she has memorized it. They travel for days, following Ojiya's half of the map which Itachi discovered after he dug up her body. They arrive at Cape Hakkotsu where the treasure is located, but can't reach it without a boat. After failing to find boats at a nearby village which they believe was destroyed by bandits, they meet Shiranui, a one-armed youth who offers to take them across. They board two boats pulled by huge sharks, Jiromaru and Saburomaru. Midway across, Shiranui reveals he fed his arm to the sharks, however they developed a taste for human flesh, so he then killed the villagers to feed them. On his signal, the sharks capsize one of the boats and devour the men on board. Not wanting them to gorge themselves, he leaves Saburomaru to watch the second boat until they come back later to eat. Disheartened, Itachi recounts how he and his men were exploited by his Lord. Dororo berates them for giving up and jumps in the water as bait to lure Saburomaru. On her signal, they pull her up and when the shark surfaces, they stab and kill it. They then paddle ashore at Cape Hakkotsu. When Shiranui comes ashore to investigate, he is savagely beaten by the bandits. Itachi strips Dororo's clothes looking for the map and realizes Dororo is a girl while the heat of the fire reveals the map on her back. With the completed map, they tie up Dororo and leave, while Shiranui vows revenge. Elsewhere, as Hyakkimaru struggles to walk, he passes a monk who tells him of a man nearby who can give him a new leg, Jukai.
17	"The Story of Questions and Answers"; Transliteration: "Mondō no Maki" (Japanese: 問答の巻)	Fumihiro Yoshimura	Yasuko Kobayashi	May 6, 2019
Jukai is adding limbs to the dead on a battlefield when a ghoul attacks, but Hyakkimaru appears and kills it. Back in his cave, Jukai is horrified when Hyakkimaru explains what his father did to him. Jukai realizes that although Hyakkimaru's body has become more human, he is less human on the inside. He is reluctant to repair Hyakkimaru's leg as he fears that it will lead to more fighting and if Hyakkimaru is to be successful against the demons, he will have to confront his own family. Suddenly, a landslide blocks the entrance to the cave. While Hyakkimaru digs his way out, he reveals he is not alone as he remembers Dororo. Emerging from the cave, they find the fruit of a nearby Ayakashigi (屍木(アヤカシ木)) demon tree is producing more ghouls. Hyakkimaru slays them all until he eventually pierces the tree's heart and destroys it. At the Daigo compound, Nuinokata recovers from her suicide attempt but Tahōmaru leaves to kill a reported ghoul without visiting her. He and his aides find and wound a rat-like ghoul. Tahōmaru then burns the building to kill both the ghoul and its progeny who are still alive inside, pledging his sword to defend Daigo land. When they return, Kagemitsu sends Tahōmaru and a small army to kill Hyakkimaru. Meanwhile, Hyakkimaru rows a small boat towards Cape Hakkotsu.
18	"The Story of the Cape of No Mercy"; Transliteration: "Mujō misaki no maki" (Japanese: 無常岬の巻)	Teruyuki Omine	Kiyoko Yoshimura	May 13, 2019
Shiranui calls on the giant shark Jiromaru (二郎丸) to eat Saburomaru's body and it evolves into a demon capable of moving onto land. It attacks Dororo but she is saved by Hyakkimaru, who slays the demon. Hyakkimaru's left leg is restored. Meanwhile, Itachi finds a cave and two of his men rush in but are killed by booby-trapped explosives. Tahōmaru and a fleet land on the shore in pursuit of Hyakkimaru, and Tahōmaru gives orders to leave no one alive. Several of Itachi's remaining men fall to Daigo arrows and Dororo and Hyakkimaru come across a wounded Itachi. Hyakkimaru is attacked by Tahōmaru, Mutsu, and Hyogo so Itachi grabs Dororo and flees more arrows. High above, Shiranui detonates the booby-trap bombs he removed in an attempt to kill everyone, killing himself and causing a landslide. Many of Tahōmaru's men are killed and Hyogo is badly wounded so they decide to withdraw, assuming Hyakkimaru is dead. Meanwhile, Dororo and the mortally wounded Itachi fall into a cave created by the explosion and discover the treasure. Itachi dies after seeing it. Hyakkimaru finds Dororo, who decides to leave the treasure hidden until she decides what to do with it.
19	"The Story of the Amanojaku"; Transliteration: "Amanojaku no maki" (Japanese: 天邪鬼の巻)	Hisatoshi Shimizu	Shigeru Murakoshi	May 20, 2019
Hyakkimaru and Dororo seek the swordsmith named Munetsuna to repair the swords in Hyakkimaru's prosthetic, but the villagers tell them Munetsuna's swords are poor and his daughter Okowa is ugly. They find neither is true, although their house is filled with grotesque hyottoko masks. When Munetsuna takes the swords to a temple to be purified, an amanojaku casts a spell over Hyakkimaru, who begins to say and do the opposite of what he intends, ending his journey and deciding to marry with Okowa. Feeling rejected, Dororo plans to throw away Hyakkimaru's swords, but she encounters Munetsuna at the foundry where she tells him how she feels. The next morning, Dororo realizes she and everyone in the village have been saying the opposite of what they mean, and that somehow Munetsuna's masks enable the truth to be told. Taking a mask, Dororo goes to the temple, but the amanojaku causes Hyakkimaru to attack Dororo until Munetsuna, also wearing a mask, knocks out the amanojaku. Munesuna explains that the mischievous amanojaku was sealed under a statue in the temple, but it escaped. Okowa then realizes they were protected by the hyottoko masks and Munetsuna uprights the statue, resealing the amanojaku. Okowa and Hyakkimaru break their engagement, but she later marries a young man from the village. Hyakkimaru refits the repaired swords and continues his journey with Dororo.
20	"The Story of the Nue"; Transliteration: "Nue no maki" (Japanese: 鵺の巻)	Sei Satō	Akira Kindaichi	May 27, 2019
Tahōmaru and his aides observe misfortune befalling Daigo's villages, and since it started at the borders and is spreading inwards they suspect the demons are upset Hyakkimaru isn't dead. Back in his compound, Kagemitsu Daigo realizes his deal with the demons has been revoked since the destruction of the Goddess of Mercy statue and the days of prosperity are over. Meanwhile, Hyakkimaru and Dororo encounter Dice-spot Saburota who is hunting a local demon that ate his mother. They lay in wait and a gigantic Nue (鵺) appears. Hyakkimaru goes to fight it but is intercepted by Saburota who now delights in seeing the demon devour terrified travelers. During the fight, Hyakkimaru and Dororo fall down a rocky embankment and Dororo's arm becomes trapped. Hyakkimaru is unable to free her despite breaking his left prosthetic arm and subterranean water begins to rise. Suddenly the Biwa-Hōshi appears and frees Dororo, though his sword is broken. Again determined to regain his body, Hyakkimaru attacks and badly wounds the Nue. It eats Saburota in desperation, absorbing him into its body. Hyakkimaru finally slays it; however no part of his body is returned to him, even when he cuts the nue to pieces, much to the horror of Dororo. The Biwa-Hōshi watches sadly as the brutality results in Hyakkimaru's aura gaining a red heart, thinking he has a heavy fate to bear. Hyakkimaru realizes he must confront Kagemitsu Daigo to have his body fully restored.
21	"The Story of Breaking the Cycle of Suffering"; Transliteration: "Gyakuru no maki" (Japanese: 逆流(ぎゃくる)の巻)	Nobuyoshi Arai	Shigeru Murakoshi	June 3, 2019
Hyakkimaru approaches Daigo territory and Dororo is saddened his single-minded desire to recover his body parts. They are recognized by a villager who notifies Kagemitsu Daigo. Meanwhile, the situation worsens in Daigo territory: villages which have become diseased are burned and their inhabitants killed; able-bodied men are conscripted for the war against the threatening Asakura Clan; horses, including a nursing mother horse named Midoro (ミドロ号), are requisitioned. Tahōmaru decides to take Mutsu and Hyogo to stop Hyakkimaru himself. Along the way, Mutsu and Hyogo recall their capture after seeing their parents killed and later being freed by Kagemitsu to be raised alongside Tahōmaru. They find Hyakkimaru and Dororo at a ravine littered with soldiers' bodies and attack him together. Hyakkimaru severs Mutsu's right arm and Hyogo's left arm, and again cuts Tahōmaru’s right eye as Dororo looks on in horror at Hyakkimaru's savagery. Suddenly, a group of men sent by Kagemitsu to protect their prince intervene. The leader sends Midoro loaded with explosives towards Hyakkimaru, killing the horse and blowing Hyakkimaru into the ravine. Dororo is captured by the villagers and Tahōmaru is subdued by a dart when he refuses to leave. Later, spirits possess Midoro's body parts, turning it into a flaming horse.
22	"The Story of Nui"; Transliteration: "Nui no maki" (Japanese: 縫の巻)	Teruyuki Omine	Kiyoko Yoshimura	June 10, 2019
Tahōmaru's group return home with Dororo while Kagemitsu prepares to repel an impending attack by the Asakura Clan, planning to fight at Banmon. Hyakkimaru is enraged Dororo has been kidnapped, his rage drawing the demon horse to him. Tahōmaru visits Hyogo's sister Mutsu, who lost her right arm and is also weak from a disease she was hiding, but she refuses to see him as she won't risk infection. Meanwhile Nuinokata frees Dororo in gratitude for providing companionship for son Hyakkimaru and leaves with her. Their boat is smashed in the strong current and they are rescued by Daigo refugees, including the Biwa-Hōshi. Nuinokata decides to stay to help care for the sick and wounded. Mutsu leaves the compound, badly ill, prompting Tahōmaru and Hyogo to go after her. Elsewhere, Hyakkimaru has joined with the demonic horse Midoro and is cutting a bloody swathe through Daigo's soldiers, seeking Dororo. Mutsu staggers to the demon temple and offers herself to the twelfth and final demon to protect the land and its people. Tahōmaru and Hyogo arrive to see her offer rejected. However, when Tahōmaru, Mutsu, and Hyogo later intercept Hyakkimaru their wounds have been healed by the demon; Mutsu and Hyogo each bear one of Hyakkimaru's real arms and Tahōmaru has his two eyes.
23	"The Story of the Demons"; Transliteration: "Kishin no maki" (Japanese: 鬼神の巻)	Daisuke Tokutsuchi	Yasuko Kobayashi	June 17, 2019
Daigo villagers near the border prepare for the impending war and Midoro's foal runs away. Hyakkimaru attacks Tahōmaru, Mutsu and Hyogo to reclaim his eyes and arms. Meanwhile, Nuinokata and Dororo arrive at the battle but are held back by the Biwa-Hōshi. Midoro attacks Mutsu and Hyogo, but is distracted by the arrival of her foal and is wounded. Enraged, Midoro tears off Hyogo's head and crushes Mutsu, but their bodies are controlled by the demon which uses their arms to fatally wound Midoro. On their deaths, Hyakkimaru's arms return to him, and he grabs the two sword blades that were in his prosthesis with his bare hands to keep fighting Tahōmaru. Confused by emotions when he sees Nuinokata and Dororo approach, Hyakkimaru runs off with Tahōmaru in pursuit. The villagers, Biwa-Hōshi, Nuinokata, and Dororo debate the value of one life against the needs of many, and conclude only what is gained by their own hands will last. At the border, Kagemitsu Daigo leads his army forward, determined to defeat the Asakura and give meaning to his decisions. Hyakkimaru follows Tahōmaru to the Daigo castle and their fight resumes. During the struggle they knock over a candle stand, setting the castle on fire. The smoke alerts Dororo and Nuinokata, who are drawn by concern for the young brothers.
24	"Dororo and Hyakkimaru"; Transliteration: "Dororo to Hyakkimaru" (Japanese: どろろと百鬼丸)	Kazuhiro Furuhashi	Yasuko Kobayashi	June 24, 2019
Tahōmaru and Hyakkimaru continue their fierce battle inside the burning Daigo castle, each believing it is their inherited domain. Meanwhile, Nuinokata leaves the Biwa-Hōshi and Dororo while she enters the castle through a hidden tunnel and meets Jukai. Above them, Hyakkimaru finally defeats Tahōmaru but does not kill him. The demon with Hyakkimaru's eyes tries to take control of Tahōmaru, but he removes the eyes, which return to Hyakkimaru. After Hyakkimaru slays the demon, he becomes whole for the first time and Jukai gives him a newly carved Goddess of Mercy statue. Dororo and Hyakkimaru are reunited as the castle burns. Nuinokata tends to Tahōmaru as he dies in her arms and the castle collapses. Meanwhile, the last demon statue falls in the Hall of Hell and Kagemitsu Daigo leads his army against the Asakura, losing many of his men. Later, Dororo proposes to retrieve the treasure to help the Daigo refugees while Hyakkimaru finds his father wounded but defiant in the Hall of Hell. However, when Hyakkimaru departs without killing him, leaving the Goddess of Mercy statue behind, Kagemitsu realizes if he had not made the pact with the demons, Hyakkimaru may have had the ability to save his land. Hyakkimaru departs alone, leaving Dororo behind, knowing however that they will meet again in the future. In the final scene, some years later, Dororo, now a young woman, runs to greet Hyakkimaru, who smiles as he turns to see her.
