= Amanojaku =

Yōkai

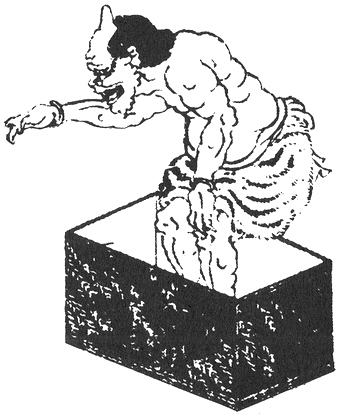
A depiction of amanojaku by Jippensha Ikku

The Amanojaku (天邪鬼(あまのじゃく)) or Amanjaku (天邪鬼(あまんじゃく)) ("heavenly evil spirit") is a demon-like creature in Japanese folklore, considered a type of wicked ogre-god (akukijin), small ogre (ko-oni), or yōkai. The name is also written using the kanji (河伯) ("River Earl") or (海若) ("Sea Spirit").

== Origins ==
The origins of the Amanojaku are found in both Buddhist iconography and ancient Japanese Shinto mythology, which eventually syncretized.

=== Buddhist and Chinese origins ===
In Buddhism, the Amanojaku is considered a symbol of human earthly desires (bonnō). It is depicted as a wicked demon being trampled underfoot by the Four Heavenly Kings or by Vajrapani (Shūkongōshin). It also refers to the ogre-faced mask found on the abdomen of the armor of Bishamonten, one of the Four Heavenly Kings.

This iconography is derived from a Chinese water spirit known as the "Kahaku" (River Earl), represented by the ogre face. Furthermore, another Chinese water spirit known as "Kaijaku" is read in Japanese Kun'yomi as "Amanojaku". Consequently, these Chinese concepts syncretized with the indigenous Japanese Amanojaku, and the term came to refer to the class of demons trampled under the feet of deities. In this Buddhist context, where it is considered an opponent of teachings, it is also called a jaki (邪鬼).

=== Japanese mythology ===
The indigenous Japanese Amanojaku originates from the deities Ame-no-wakahiko (Heavenly Young Lad) and the goddess Amenosagume (Heavenly Spy Woman) found in the Kojiki and Nihon Shoki.

In the myth, Amenowakahiko was sent by Amaterasu to pacify the Ashihara no Nakatsukuni (Central Land of Reed Plains). However, he forgot his duty, took the daughter of Ōkuninushi as his wife, and did not return for eight years. When a pheasant named Nakime was sent as a second messenger to find him, Amenowakahiko shot and killed the bird with an arrow upon the suggestion of Amenosagume, who was serving him. However, that arrow was shot back from the heavens, killing Amenowakahiko himself.

Amenosagume, as her name implies, was a shamanistic existence capable of exploring the movements of heaven, the future, and human hearts. This legend later evolved into the concept of a small demon who reads people's hearts and plays pranks in opposition to them. Originally, Amenosagume was not a villain, but because she told tales to Amenowakahiko, she came to be said to be a demon who hinders heaven—an "Amanojaku" (Heavenly Evil Spirit). Furthermore, because "Amenowakahiko" is also written as "天若彦" or "天若日子" (incorporating the character jaku/waka), it is thought that this figure syncretized with the Buddhist/Chinese "Kaijaku" (海若).

The Wakan Sansai Zue, an encyclopedia from the Edo period, cites the Sendai Kuji Hongi in stating that the ferocious spirit (mōki) vomited from within the body of Susanoo became the goddess Amanozako. She is considered the ancestor of the Amanojaku and the Tengu.

== Folklore ==
In folk tales, the Amanojaku is described as a being with an extremely contrary nature: If it were ordered something, it would do the opposite. It is generally considered a yōkai that guesses the human heart and teases people by mimicking their words, provoking a person's darkest desires and instigating them into perpetrating wicked deeds. It is usually depicted as a kind of small oni. However, traditions vary significantly by region.

=== Regional variations ===
- Echoes: In Hiraka District (Akita Prefecture), Inashiki District (Ibaraki Prefecture), Ora District (Gunma Prefecture), and Tagata District (Shizuoka Prefecture), the Kodama (tree spirit) or Yamabiko (echo) are called "Amanojaku" because they mimic human voices. It is said that the reverberation of voices in the mountains is the Amanojaku mimicking the sound.
- Yamauba: In Haga District (Tochigi Prefecture), Nishitonami District (Toyama Prefecture), and Kamo District (Gifu Prefecture), the Yamauba (Mountain Crone) is referred to as Amanojaku.
- Giants: In Hakone, Kanagawa Prefecture and Izu, Shizuoka Prefecture, the Amanojaku is handed down as a giant-like being. Legend states that an Amanojaku once tried to break down Mount Fuji but failed, and the soil that spilled out during the attempt became Izu Oshima. In Chūō Town (now Misaki), Kume District, Okayama Prefecture, an Amanojaku piled up stones to make Mount Futakami higher, but failed because dawn broke before it was finished. In Taka District, Hyōgo Prefecture, an Amanojaku is said to have tried to build a bridge between mountains but similarly failed. In these regions, places where natural stones are scattered on mountaintops or stone walls of unknown origin are attributed to the work of Amanojaku.
- Insects: In Kunohe District, Iwate Prefecture, the Amanojaku is said to be inside the ash of the hearth. In the Tōhoku region, the Amanojaku refers to a chrysalis. in Kakunodate, Senboku District, Akita, it refers to the booklouse.
- Babysitting: A superstition in Hiraka District (now Yokote), Akita, held that the Amanojaku would babysit infants and keep them from crying.
- Nagano: In a place called "Kappou" deep in Koumi, Minamisaku District, Nagano Prefecture, there lived an Amanojaku. It had a huge body, and there are traces of it crossing a mountain in one go and resting its hand-pail. Footprints of the Amanojaku also remain in the vicinity.

=== Urikohime ===
One of the amanojaku's best known appearances is in the fairytale Uriko-hime (瓜子姫; "melon princess"), in which a girl miraculously born from a melon is doted upon by an elderly couple. They shelter her from the outside world, and she naively lets the amanojaku inside one day, where it kidnaps or devours her, and sometimes impersonates her by wearing her flayed skin.

== Modern usage ==
Derived from the definition of a "small demon who mimics people's hearts and plays pranks", the term has evolved in modern times. It is now used to refer to a "twisted person" or a "contrarian" who speaks or acts in opposition to the thoughts and actions of others (or the majority).

This personality trait is often emphasized when the Amanojaku is adapted as a character in visual media. For example, in the Tokusatsu production Guruguru Medaman, the character appears as one who invites conflict among friends. In Ninja Sentai Kakuranger, the Amanojaku appears as a villain who makes people mean-spirited and causes disturbances.

== In popular culture ==
- In the manga Nura: Rise of the Yokai Clan, an amanojaku named Awashima is revealed to be male during the day and female at night.
- In the manga Urotsukidōji, Amano Jyaku is the titular protagonist.
- In the anime Ghost Stories, an amanojaku is accidentally sealed inside the protagonist's pet cat in the first episode. It becomes part of the main cast for the rest of the series.
- In the Touhou Project video game Double Dealing Character, the stage 5 boss is an amanojaku named Seija Kijin who has the ability to turn things over. Seija is also the protagonist in the spin-off sequel, Impossible Spell Card.
  - In the spin-off ZUN made for a Comic-con in Japan, Gold Rush, Seija Kijin is also the protagonist. However, ZUN never released the game to the public.
- In the game Shin Megami Tensei, an amanojaku kills and eats the protagonist's mother and impersonates her.
- There is a Tokyo-based taiko group called "Taiko Shūdan Amanojaku".
- In the movie "Ten Nights of Dreams" based on Natsume Soseki's novel, there is an Amanojaku that provokes the woman in the Fifth Night.
- In the musical series "The Story of the Kitsune and the Demon"/"狐と鬼の話" (commonly referred to as "The Onibi series") by Japanese music producer – MASA Works DESIGN- there is a character named Shikyou (死凶) who is an Amanojaku that serves as the series antagonist.
- In the anime Dororo the main characters encounter the Amanojaku in episode 14 of the 1969 series and episode 19 of the 2019 series.
- In the book series "Shadow of the Fox" by Julie Kagawa, amanjaku are tiny demons fighting against the main protagonists.
- In Kamen Rider Saber web-movie Kamen Rider Saber Spin-off: Kamen Rider Sabela & Kamen Rider Durendal, the main antagonist Rui Mitarai assume a Megid form called Amanojaku Megid, which is based on Amanojaku itself.
- In the movie My_Oni_Girl the Japanese title is translated as "I like it but I don't like it Amanojaku"
- In the anime Sword of the Demon Hunter: Kijin Gentōshō, Episode 16 was about a Amanojaku and her child, searching for someone to raise it.
- In the Yu-Gi-Oh! Trading Card Game, there is a Trap Card called "Amanojaku's Curse" (known as Reverse Trap in international markets). It has the effect of swapping ATK/DEF gains on monsters, in reference to the Amanojaku's contradictory nature.

== See also ==
- Ame-no-wakahiko
- List of legendary creatures from Japan
- Amanozako
