= Amanozako =

Japanese goddess

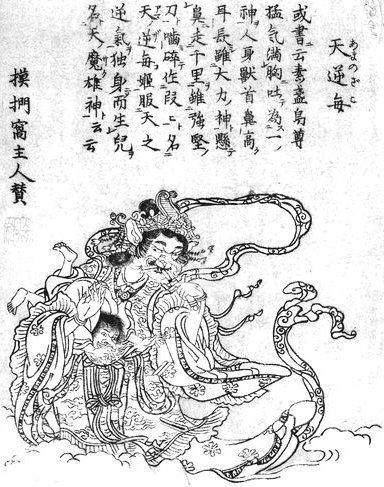
The amanozako as illustrated by Toriyama Sekien.

Amanozako (天逆毎; "heaven opposing everything", or 天狗神 "tengu kami") is a monstrous goddess mentioned in the Kujiki, which states that she originated when Susanoo let his own ferocious spirit (his ara-mitama) build up inside him until he vomited her out.

== Personality ==
The Wakan Sansai Zue describes this deity as having a furious temper, a beastly head with a long nose, long ears, and great fangs so strong they can chew metal blades ragged, and to be capable of flying for a thousand li.

Amanozako has been known to be a goddess that goes against conformity and does the opposite of what is expected by society and social norms. Also, it is said that Amanozako is picky, and will go into an atrocious rage if she does not get what she wants, or if things do not go according to her way. Her wrath cannot be stopped.

In terms of her godly abilities, the legends and stories say that Amanozako is a trickster, of sorts. She likes to possess the hearts of humans and manipulate their emotions and personalities.

== History ==
Stories of Amanozako were being told long before history began being recorded. It is said that she is the ancestor deity of all yōkai who share her short-fused temper and disobedience. Some of these yōkai include tengu, as well as amanojaku.

Amanozako was illustrated by Toriyama Sekien in the third volume of his Konjaku Gazu Zoku Hyakki.

== Family/Relations ==
Amanozako is known to be the motherless child of the deity Susanoo, the god of storms, from the text.

She has one child, which, due to her obstinate behavior, she gave being to all on her own. Amanosaku is Amanozako's spawn, and is said to be just as terrible and disobedient as she is. Apparently, Amanosaku drove all 8 million gods in heaven mad, and because of this, Amanosaku was made the ruler of every malicious and troublesome kami.

== In popular culture ==
Amanozako makes her first appearance in the long-running Megami Tensei franchise as one of its many demons in 2021's Shin Megami Tensei V. Unlike most depictions of her where she's rather monstrous looking, the game depicts her as a smaller fairy-like creature with a more cute appearance comparable to that of its iconic Pixie. She acts as a companion towards the game's protagonist throughout the game after finding him wandering throughout the game's Da'at.
