= The Legend of Dororo and Hyakkimaru =

Japanese manga series

- First tankōbon volume cover

どろろと百鬼丸伝 (Dororo to Hyakkimaru Den)
- Genre: Action; Dark fantasy; Historical fantasy
- Created by: Osamu Tezuka
- Manga
- Written by: Satoshi Shiki
- Published by: Akita Shoten
- English publisher: NA: Seven Seas Entertainment
- Magazine: Champion Red
- Original run: October 19, 2018 – October 18, 2025
- Volumes: 13
- icon

The Legend of Dororo and Hyakkimaru (Japanese: どろろと百鬼丸伝, Hepburn: Dororo to Hyakkimaru Den) is a Japanese manga series written and illustrated by Satoshi Shiki. It is a remake of the original manga series Dororo by Osamu Tezuka. It was serialized in Akita Shoten's Champion Red magazine from October 2018 to October 2025.

== Plot ==
During Japan's turbulent Sengoku period, a man sells his son to a band of demons in exchange for the power to rule. Forty-eight demons take forty-eight pieces of young Hyakkimaru, and the boy is presumed dead. However, with the help of a sage and a series of ingenious prosthetics, Hyakkimaru survives. Now an adult, Hyakkimaru embarks on a journey with the young thief Dororo to slay all the demons and recover the stolen pieces of his body.

== Publication ==
Satoshi Shiki's The Legend of Dororo and Hyakkimaru was serialized in Akita Shoten's Champion Red magazine from October 19, 2018, to October 18, 2025. Its chapters were collected in thirteen tankōbon volumes, released from April 19, 2019, to December 19, 2025.

In North America, the manga has been licensed by Seven Seas Entertainment, and the first volume was released on June 9, 2020.

=== Volumes ===
| No. | Original release date | Original ISBN | English release date | English ISBN |
|---|---|---|---|---|
| 1 | April 19, 2019 | 978-4-253-23693-5 | July 7, 2020 | 978-1-64505-637-9 |
| 2 | September 20, 2019 | 978-4-253-23694-2 | November 3, 2020 | 978-1-64505-760-4 |
| 3 | March 19, 2020 | 978-4-253-23695-9 | April 27, 2021 | 978-1-64827-100-7 |
| 4 | December 18, 2020 | 978-4-253-23696-6 | December 28, 2021 | 978-1-64827-350-6 |
| 5 | July 19, 2021 | 978-4-253-23697-3 | September 27, 2022 | 978-1-63858-238-0 |
| 6 | February 18, 2022 | 978-4-253-23698-0 | September 26, 2023 | 978-1-63858-847-4 |
| 7 | September 20, 2022 | 978-4-253-23699-7 | March 19, 2024 | 979-8-88843-017-0 |
| 8 | April 20, 2023 | 978-4-253-23700-0 | October 1, 2024 | 979-8-88843-395-9 |
| 9 | October 19, 2023 | 978-4-253-23704-8 | March 25, 2025 | 979-8-89160-909-9 |
| 10 | June 19, 2024 | 978-4-253-23708-6 | September 9, 2025 | 979-8-89373-767-7 |
| 11 | December 19, 2024 | 978-4-253-32351-2 | March 24, 2026 | 979-8-89561-277-4 |
| 12 | July 18, 2025 | 978-4-253-32352-9 | October 6, 2026 | 979-8-89765-550-2 |
| 13 | December 19, 2025 | 978-4-253-00932-4 | April 20, 2027 | 979-8-89863-392-9 |
