= Uriko-hime =

Female character in Japanese folktales

Urikohime, Uriko-hime or Uriko Hime (うりこひめ; English: Princess Melon, Melon Maid or Melon Princess) is a dark Japanese folktale about a girl that is born out of a melon, adopted by a family and replaced by an evil creature named Amanojaku.

== Summary ==
A melon comes washing down the stream until it is found by a human couple. They cut open the fruit and a girl appears out of it. They name her Urikohime (uri means "melon" in Japanese). They raise her and she becomes a beautiful young lady. One day, she is left alone at home and told to be careful of any stranger who comes knocking. Unfortunately, a yōkai named Amanojaku sets its sights on the girl. The creature appears at her house and asks the girl to open. She opens the door just a bit and the creature forces its entry in her house.

In one version of the story, Amanojaku kills Urikohime and wears her skin. The creature replaces Urikohime as the couple's daughter, but its disguise is ruined when the girl, reincarnated as a little bird, reveals the deception and eventually regains her human form.

In another account, Urikohime becomes known for her great weaving abilities. Due to this, she is betrothed to a lord or prince. Before she marries, Amanojaku kills her and wears her dress, or ties her to a persimmon tree. The false bride is taken to the wedding on a palanquin, but the ruse is discovered. In the version where she is roped up, Urikohime yelps out to anyone to hear and is rescued. The thing is chased away.

== Alternate names ==
Scholar Kunio Yanagita indicated alternate names to the tale: Urikohimeko, Urihime, Urihimeko.

== Distribution ==
According to Japanese folklorist Keigo Seki's notations, several variations are recorded in Japanese compilations. Further studies show that the tale can be found all over the Japanese archipelago. Hiroko Ikeda's index of Japanese tales lists 102 versions of the story.

According to Fanny Hagin Mayer, "most versions" of the story end on a tragic note, but all seem to indicate the great weaving skills of Urikohime. Scholar Kunio Yanagita listed the tale Nishiki Chōja as one version of the story that contains a happy ending.

== Analysis ==
Japanese scholarship argues for some relationship between this tale and Aarne-Thompson-Uther Index tale type ATU 408, "The Three Citrons", since both tales involve a maiden born of a fruit and her replacement for a false bride (in the tale type) and for evil creature Amanojaku (in Japanese versions). In fact, professor Hiroko Ikeda classified the story of Urikohime as type 408B in her Japanese catalogue.

Attention has also been drawn to the motif of "The False Bride" that exists in both tales: in Urikohime, the youkai or ogress wears the skin of the slain girl. Folklorist Christine Goldberg recognizes that this is the motif Disguised Flayer (motif K1941 in the Motif-Index of Folk-Literature). This disguise is also used by heroines in other folktales.

Professor Fanny Hagin Mayer remarked on the characters of the elderly couple that adopts Urikohime, which appear in several other Japanese folktales as a set. The elderly woman teaches her adopted daughter skills in weaving.

== See also ==
- Momotaro
- The Tale of the Bamboo Cutter

== Bibliography ==
- Bonnin, Philippe (2003). "L'Impossible clôture de la maison dans les contes japonais". Les Temps modernes (in French). 2003/3 (624): 35–53. doi:10.3917/ltm.624.0035. ISSN 0040-3075.
- Eder, Matthias (1969). "Reality in Japanese Folktales". Asian Folklore Studies. 28 (1): 17–25. doi:10.2307/1177778. JSTOR 1177778.
- Fujii Michiaki 藤井 倫明 (February 28, 2013). "Urikohime no tanjō - amanojaku no higeki -" 瓜子姫の誕生 －アマノジャクの悲劇－. Departmental Bulletin Paper (in Japanese). 13. Rissho University: 18–27. hdl:11266/5645. ISSN 1884-2968.
- Goldberg, Christine (Winter 1997). "The Donkey Skin Folktale Cycle (AT 510B)". Journal of American Folklore. 110 (435): 28–46. doi:10.2307/541584. JSTOR 541584.
- Kunio, Yanagita (1986). The Yanagita Kunio Guide to the Japanese Folk Tale. Translated by Mayer, Fanny Hagin. Indiana University Press. ISBN 0-253-36812-X. OCLC 13124829.
- King, Emerald L.; Fraser, Lucy (2019). "Girls in Lace Dresses: The Intersections of Gothic in Japanese Youth Fiction and Fashion". In Jackson, Anna (ed.). New directions in children's gothic: debatable lands. London: Routledge. pp. 102–118. ISBN 978-0-367-34631-7. OCLC 1099309931.
- Mayer, Fanny Hagin (1960). "Character Portrayal in the Japanese Folk Tale". Anthropos. 55 (5/6): 665–670. ISSN 0257-9774. JSTOR 40454420.
- Mayer, Fanny Hagin (1974). "Religious Concepts in the Japanese Folk Tale". Japanese Journal of Religious Studies. 1 (1): 73–101. doi:10.18874/jjrs.1.1.1974.73-101. ISSN 0304-1042. JSTOR 30234416.
- Nakawaki, Hatsue (2020). "Japanese Heroine Tales and the Significance of Storytelling in Contemporary Society". In Murai, Mayako; Cardi, Luciana (eds.). Re-orienting the fairy tale: contemporary adaptations across cultures. Detroit, Michigan: Wayne State University Press. pp. 139–168. ISBN 978-0-8143-4537-5. OCLC 1143644471.
- Seki, Keigo (1966). "Types of Japanese Folktales". Asian Folklore Studies. 25 (1): 17–25. doi:10.2307/1177478. JSTOR 1177478.
- Takagi Masafumi 高木 昌史 (March 2013). "Shirīzu/ hikaku minwa (ichi) urikohime/ mittsu no orenji" シリーズ/比較民話(一)瓜子姫/三つのオレンジ [Series: Comparative Studies of the Folktale (1) Melon Princess/The Three Oranges]. Seijō Bungei 成城文藝 (in Japanese). 222. Seijo University: 45–64. ISSN 0286-5718.
- Yamazato, Katsunori (1983). "A Note on Japanese Allusions in Gary Snyder's Poetry". Western American Literature. 18 (2): 143–148. ISSN 0043-3462. JSTOR 43018817.
