= Dororo (1969 TV series) =

Japanese anime television series

- North American DVD cover

どろろ
- Created by: Osamu Tezuka
- Anime television series
- Directed by: Gisaburou Sugii
- Written by: Yoshitake Suzuki; Tooru Sawaki; Mushi Pro Literature Room; Shuuji Hirami; Taku Sugiyama
- Music by: Isao Tomita
- Studio: Mushi Production; Group TAC (uncredited)
- Licensed by: NA: Discotek Media
- Original network: Fuji TV
- Original run: April 6, 1969 – September 28, 1969
- Episodes: 26
- icon

Dororo (どろろ) is a 1969 anime television series based on the manga of the same name by Osamu Tezuka, planned by Zuiyo Enterprise and produced by Mushi Production. In 1968, in order to pitch the series, Tezuka created a 13-minute full-color pilot which summarized the story of Hyakkimaru's birth, his upbringing and first meeting with Dororo, and an abbreviated version of "The Tale of the Monster Bandai". The series was produced in black and white coloring due to budget cuts, but made the demons look more weird and menacing.

Because the original manga series was cancelled before Tezuka had a chance to shift the focus towards Dororo's "coming-of-age" story as he had originally planned, most of the plots revolved around Hyakkimaru's battles with supernatural monsters. This caused viewers to consider Hyakkimaru as the main character and from episode 14 onward, the series was re-titled Dororo and Hyakkimaru (どろろと百鬼丸). The early cancellation of the manga series also meant there were not enough stories for the required number of episodes, so episodes 14, 15, 18, 19, 20, 23, and 25 were original stories developed specifically for the television series.

The series is first installment of World Masterpiece Theater, then known as Calpis Comic Theater, and the only one in black and white.

== Episode list ==
No.	Title	Original release date
1	"The Tale of Hyakkimaru Part 1"; Transliteration: "Hyakkimaru No Maki Sono Ichi" (Japanese: 百鬼丸の巻 その一)	April 6, 1969
At the Cloud Dragon Temple (雲龍寺), Daigo Kagemitsu, a warrior in the Age of Civil Wars offers his soon-to-be-born baby's body to the 48 demons as a sacrifice to fulfil his ambitions and rule the land. When the baby is born with 48 parts of his body missing, he forces his wife to put it in a basket and send it downriver because of its horrifying ugliness. Years later, in the aftermath of a battle, a rōnin named Hyakkimaru (百鬼丸) comes across a group of enemy soldiers. When they attack him, his arms become swords and he kills them all. Meanwhile, in a nearby village a young thief named Dororo (どろろ), tries to steal a sword from a weapons dealer. Dororo is chased and encounters a starving monk who calls for help. Dororo gets some food, but by the time Dororo returns, the monk has died. Later Dororo eats the food of a band of thieves, but is caught, beaten up and then thrown in the river. Hyakkimaru intervenes but a spirit appears from the water and consumes the leader. Hyakkimaru kills the spirit and Dororo decides to follow him, but not wanting company, Hyakkimaru reveals his fake eyeballs to scare Dororo.
2	"The Tale of Hyakkimaru Part 2"; Transliteration: "Hyakkimaru No Maki Sono Ni" (Japanese: 百鬼丸の巻 その二)	April 13, 1969
Dororo insists on following Hyakkimaru, so he tells Dororo how Jukai-sensei found him as an infant Hyakkimaru on the riverbank and took him home and how the doctor made prostheses for him so that he appeared normal. Hyakkimaru learned that only by defeating the 48 demons who possessed his body parts could he become fully human. To help Hyakkimaru in his quest, Jukai-sensei inserted an excellent sword he received from a general into Hyakkimaru's prosthic arm. On his travels Hyakkimaru met an old blind monk named Zatō (座頭) who realized Hyakkimaru's sad predicament. He took Hyakkimaru to an orphanage of children damaged by war where Hyakkimaru stayed and honed his fighting skills. There he met and fell in love with Mio, but one day the orphanage was set on fire by the local samurai with Mio and the children inside, his dreams vanishing in the flames. Enraged, Hyakkimaru attacked and killed all the samurai.
3	"The Tale of the Monster Bandai Part 1"; Transliteration: "Bandai (Ban Dai) No Maki Sono Ichi" (Japanese: 万代（ばんだい）の巻 その一)	April 20, 1969
Hyakkimaru tells Dororo that after the death of Mio and the children in the orphanage, wherever he travelled, he has been stalked by demons and suddenly kills one who had been watching them. Dororo could not be dissuaded though, and persists in following Hyakkimaru. That night, a monstrous character Kanekozo (金小僧) carrying a bell approaches their camp, looks at Hyakkimaru and leaves. They enter a village looking for the monster and are captured and brought before Lady Bandai (万代). She denies the existence of any monsters and locks them in a basement room. They are confronted by a watery monster, but Hyakkimaru drives it back into the well. Dororo follows the monster's trail to Lady Bandai's mansion and Dororo is caught by villages and beaten up, but Hyakkimaru comes to the rescue. The villages highly respect Lady Bandai, but say the village is cursed. Hyakkimaru leads them to a bamboo grove where they see Kanekozo.
4	"The Tale of the Monster Bandai Part 2"; Transliteration: "Bandai (Ban Dai) No Maki Sono Ni" (Japanese: 万代の巻 その二)	April 27, 1969
The story is told of a monster that moved into a small remote peaceful village in the mountains when it became prosperous and took its food and money. When the village lost heart, a wealthy woman, as beautiful as Bodhisattva, moved in and gave money to the village, but when it began to prosper again the monster would reappear. After Hyakkimaru saved Dororo from the monster, he and the villagers follow the mysterious monster Kanekozo from the riverbank to the bamboo grove. When Kanekozo fades away, Hyakkimaru gets the villagers to dig where it was, and find gold coins buried below the ground. They tell Lady Bandai and distribute the gold amongst the villagers. That night, Hyakkimaru and the villagers lie in wait for the monster while Dororo keeps watch on Lady Bandai, but falls asleep. The monster destroys a villager's house and Hyakkimaru follows it to lady Bandai's house where her real demonic form is revealed. Hyakkimaru and the villagers give chase and eventually kill the monster. As it dies, Hyakkimaru's left leg grows back to his joy and amazement, but the villagers force the two strangers to leave because in their eyes, Hyakkimaru is also a monster.
5	"The Tale of the Misery Chronicles Part 1"; Transliteration: "Muzanchō (Muzanchou) No Maki Sono Ichi" (Japanese: 無残帖（むざんちょう）の巻 その一)	May 4, 1969
Hyakkimaru and Dororo walk for days in punishing heat until Dororo collapses from heatstroke. Delirious, Dororo starts talking about his childhood. The bloody Onin War saw the country split in two with many casualties on both sides and villages and fields burned which created food shortages. Some died of starvation while others took up weapons and became bandits. A group of bandits led by Hibukuro rob a village, and kill all of the villagers who support the samurai. Some of his men want to join the samurai to increase their power and wealth but Hibukuro and his wife Ojiya oppose the idea. That night some of his men led by Itachi kidnap Dororo, the child of Hibukuro and Ojiya, and demand that he go to the magistrate's office to get Dororo back. Hibukuro and Ojiya go, but are arrested and Hibukuro is beaten mercilessly. Fortunately young Dororo stole the key to the cell and they managed to escape, with Ojiya taking Dororo as a windstorm approached. Hibukuro stayed and cut the foundations of the magistrate's house which then collapsed during the windstorm and he set it on fire, killing everyone inside. Ojiya runs into Hibukuro's bandits, now led by the traitorous Itachi.
6	"The Tale of the Misery Chronicles Part 2"; Transliteration: "Muzanchō No Maki Sono Ni" (Japanese: 無残帖の巻 その二)	May 11, 1969
Dororo continues the tale of misery. When Hibukuro catches up with his men, he finds that Itachi has usurped his leadership and he has Ojiya and Dororo captive. Itachi forces Hibukuro to surrender and has him is shot in the legs with arrows. Four years later the family is poor and hungry, with Hibukuro crippled and Ojiya is unable to provide for the three of them. They come across a devastated village and Dororo finds the victorious samurai roasting meat, when suddenly the surviving villagers attack and kill them. As the food is about to be distributed, Dororo grabs the meat and runs off. The villagers catch Dororo and the family is driven out of the village. Hibukuro tells Dororo that the ones who wage the war are responsible for the ruin of the country and its people. Hibukuro come down with a fever, and while Ojiya is gathering water, a passing princess offers food to Dororo. Hibukuro refuses the food, insults the princess, attacks her retainers and then is killed in the ensuing fight. Winter arrives, and eventually cold and starving, Ojiya dies in the snow leaving Dororo all alone. In the present, Dororo's fever subsides.
7	"The Tale of the Demon Sword Nihil Part 1"; Transliteration: "Yōtō Ni Hiru (Ni Hiru) No Maki Sono Ichi" (Japanese: 妖刀似蛭（にひる）の巻 その一)	May 18, 1969
Hyakkimaru is challenged by a stranger possessed by sprits of the dead. He is Tanosuke Niki, the owner of the demon sword Nihil with a dark and bloody history. Hyakkimaru defeats the swordsman and they depart, but Dororo runs back to retrieve the sword, even though Hyakkimaru warned against touching it. Shortly thereafter, the sword possesses Dororo and cries for blood, forcing Dororo to attack their dog Nota with it. They arrive at a house and Nota is confronted by a pack of hungry dogs. When the dogs see Dororo they attack, but Dororo savagely cuts them all down with the demon sword. The sword however says it wants to drink human blood. Dororo finds an old man and his daughter at a temple, and attacks them and wounds the father, but the daughter Osushi has a talisman which stops Dororo. A warning is spread throughout the village to hide indoors because of a killer disguised as a child. When Osushi goes to the inn for food, she meets her brother, the former owner of the demon sword Nihil. He has been absent for 5 years after becoming an ashigaru soldier in the lord's service, but he is only interested in finding Dororo and retrieving the sword.
8	"The Tale of the Demon Sword Nihil Part 2"; Transliteration: "Yōtō Ni Hiru No Maki Sono Ni" (Japanese: 妖刀似蛭の巻 その二)	May 25, 1969
To retrieve the sword Tanosuke attacks Dororo who is holed up in a blacksmith's hut, but fails. Tanosuke then tells his sister of his time in the lord's service where he successfully supervised the building of a fortress. He was then given the sword Nihil and ordered to kill all of the carpenters in case they divulged secrets of its construction - reluctantly he obeyed the order. He used the sword in many battles since and it developed a thirst for blood. That night, under Tanosuke's instructions, the villagers set fire to the hut and Tanosuke retrieves the sword. At the last moment, Hyakkimaru arrives and pulls Dororo from the burning building. He explains the power of the demon sword, but the villagers don't believe him until Tanosuke needlessly kills a villager and his wife. Hyakkimaru challenges Tanosuke and they fight, and Tanosuke continues even after he is wounded. Realising his situation, Tanosuke kills himself with the sword which drinks its fill on his blood. As he dies, the demon dissipates. At Tanosuke's graveside, Hyakkimaru recovers one of his eyes and is able to see for the first time, and Dororo promises never to hold a sword again.
9	"The Tale of Banmon Part 1"; Transliteration: "Banmon No Maki Sono Ichi" (Japanese: ばんもんの巻 その一)	June 1, 1969
During their travels, Hyakkimaru and Dororo encounter a high wooden wall banmon (ばんもん), marked by many arrowheads. During the night they are attacked by a nine-tailed fox, but Hyakkimaru drives it off. In the morning soldiers approach with three captives to be executed as Asakura spies: an ashigaru and two peasants who unknowingly helped him. They are tied to the banmon and executed by a volley of arrows. Angered at the cruel waste of life, Dororo attacks them bare-handed, but is thrown to the ground. Hyakkimaru intervenes, and kills one of the samurai with the sword in his arm to everyone's surprise. The lord is revealed as Daigo Kagemitsu, and when Dororo tells how Hyakkimaru's body parts were taken by demons Daigo realises that Hyakkimaru may be his own son and withdraws. Later, Hyakkimaru and Dororo arrive at a town and the hungry Dororo rushes in, but is surrounded by wary townspeople who catch and throw Dororo into the river. They mistrust anyone crossing the border marked by the Banmon, not wanting to be caught between the warring lords. Hyakkimaru arrives in the town ruled by Daigo but is accused of being an Asakura spy. He meets Tahomaru who invites him to the house of his father Daigo Kagemitsu. While waiting there, he again sees the nine-tailed fox outside the window.
10	"The Tale of Banmon Part 2"; Transliteration: "Banmon No Maki Sono Ni" (Japanese: ばんもんの巻 その二)	June 8, 1969
The nine-tailed fox attacks Hyakkimaru, but he is unable to kill it and it escapes. Daigo and his son Tahomaru question Hyakkimaru, who tells the story of his life. Daigo offers Hyakkimaru a position in under his master Lord Togashi and to help secure the border against the Asakura, but he declines. Restless during the night Hyakkimaru explores the mansion, but he is seen and chased as an Asakura spy and sheltered by Daigo's wife Nuinokata (縫の方), his mother. They share a silent moment of recognition and Hyakkimaru flees the mansion, denying the emotions which he felt. Meanwhile, Dororo is pulled from the river by Sukeroku, a local boy. Sukeroku explains how he was separated from his parents by the war and they now live on the other side of the Banmon. He also explains how the nine-tailed fox keeps the war going because it eats the bodies of the dead soldiers. That night, Hyakkimaru is attacked by the nine-tailed fox. He fights it off, but sees Daigo preparing his forces to attack the Asakura at dawn.
11	"The Tale of Banmon Part 3"; Transliteration: "Ban Mon No Maki Sono San" (Japanese: ばんもんの巻 その三)	June 15, 1969
Daigo's forces to attack the Asakura at dawn led by Tahomaru. Sukeroku wants to see his parents, so he and Dororo run across the border but they are caught. Dororo gives Sukeroku a chance to escape, but is hit by an arrow. Meanwhile Tahomaru successfully occupies the Asakura part of the town. He burns it down and takes the townspeople captive. Dororo sees Sukeroku who says his parents have been killed. All the prisoners are placed before the Banmon pleading for their lives, but slaughtered by arrows, including Sukeroku. As the bowmen are about to kill Dororo, Hyakkimaru arrives led by Nota and he kills them. Tahomaru attacks Hyakkimaru and as they fight, the nine-tailed fox demon tells Hyakkimaru that Tahomaru is his brother and he is the son of Daigo who made the pact with the 48 demons. Hyakkimaru then realises the woman who helped him was his mother. Tahomaru makes a last attack, but Hyakkimaru fatally wounds him. Hyakkimaru attacks the war-mongering demon, beheading it. It crashes into and destroys the Banmon, but the war goes on. On news of Tahomaru's death, Daigo leads his troops past the ruined Banmon in an attack on the enemy territory.
12	"Tale of the Fair Fudo Part 1"; Transliteration: "Hakumen (Haku Men) Fudō No Maki Sono Ichi" (Japanese: 白面（はくめん）不動の巻 その一)	June 22, 1969
Hyakkimaru again encounters the monk Zatō while elsewhere Dororo meets a woman Hakumen Fudō (白面不動) who changes her features to looks like Dororo's mother. Dororo follows the Hakumen Fudō home, but Nota doesn't like her. They arrive at her home near the "Waterfall of Vanity" and the Fudō Myo shrine. They hear a voice saying "I want a face" and the Hakumen Fudō leaves Dororo and goes to the waterfall and attempts to kill an ascetic meditating there, but he falls into the river below and is rescued by Nota. Hakumen Fudō goes in search of him while Dororo follows Nota who leads Dororo into an icy cave filled with faceless frozen people. While there, they and the ascetic are attacked by the Hakumen Fudō's mountain dogs which drag the man into the cave. Dororo takes Hakumen Fudō to save the ascetic, but when they arrive, the cave entrance has disappeared and she tells Dororo it was only a dream. Dororo falls asleep and Hakumen Fudō returns to the cave where she finds the ascetic without his face, and feeds one of the frozen bodies to her dogs. His face then appears on the Lord Fudō statue, but he demands another face and she promises him the face of a child.
13	"Tale of the Fair Fudo Part 2"; Transliteration: "Hakumen Fudō No Maki Sono Ni" (Japanese: 白面不動の巻 その二)	June 29, 1969
Hakumen Fudō tries to take Dororo to the Fudō Myo shrine but Dororo refuses. She carries Dororo to the shrine, but she has become attached and cannot bear to sacrifice Dororo to her master. The demon Lord Fudō creates a storm to destroy them both and Hakumen Fudō pleads for Dororo to leave, but does not. She sacrifices herself to save Dororo but the mountain dogs then attack Dororo. Meanwhile Nota has drifted downriver and is found by Hyakkimaru and Zatō. Nota leads them to the Fudō Myo shrine just in time for Hyakkimaru and Zatō save Dororo and destroy the dogs. Hyakkimaru severs the statue's head but finds it is just a mould-covered rock. As they leave Dororo floats an offering downstream for Hakumen Fudō.
14	"The Demon Kajirinkon"; Transliteration: "Yōkai Kaji Rin Kon" (Japanese: 妖怪かじりんこん)	July 6, 1969
After Dororo and Hyakkimaru spend a night at a temple, Dororo accidentally sets free an Amanojaku after eating a Manjū offering. The demon and his brothers were trapped by a guardian god at the temple gate many years ago. The three mischievous Amanojaku happily run down to the village where they causes uproar. Dororo tries to stop them, but the villagers punish Dororo whom they think is their accomplice. During the fight, Dororo knocks over a stone monument which had sealed a human-eating monster named Hitokuchi-kajiri, known as Kajirinkon. The demon was born from the perpetual greediness of an extremely cruel headman following his death. Kajirinkon chases Dororo and Amanojaku to a five-storied pagoda, where they kill the demon by burning down the building.
15	"The Empty Empty Village"; Transliteration: "Inai-Inai-Mura" (Japanese: いないいない村)	July 13, 1969
Dororo and Hyakkimaru meet a physically strong samurai called Gorobei Tawara who joins them on their travels. They enter a deserted village where Hyakkimaru detects the presence of a demon. Weird things begin to happen; blood drips from the ceiling, furniture moves, houses collapse, and cats and crows attack them. Gorobei claims that he does not believe in monsters and demons, but Hyakkimaru tracks the source to a silver vine tree and a skeletal demon appears. They defeat the demon and Hyakkimaru recovers his ears. Later, Gorobei goes his own way, now firmly believing in demons.
16	"The Demon Horse Midoro"; Transliteration: "Ayakashi Uma Midoro" (Japanese: 妖馬みどろ)	July 20, 1969
The ambitious Samurai Kageyuki Tokino's successes are partly due to his horse Midoro's good work, but when Midoro appears to slow down because of her foal, he removes the foal and sells it. Hyakkimaru buys the foal for Dororo, but the broken-hearted Midoro, breaks away and turns into a ferocious horse. She becomes possessed by a demon, setting the city aflame and killing Kageyuki, but Dororo refuses to believe she is possessed. Hyakkimaru eventually slays the horse, also destroying the demon, but both he and Dororo are saddened by her death.
17	"The Monster Donburibara"; Transliteration: "Yōkai Donburi Bara" (Japanese: 妖怪どんぶりばら)	July 27, 1969
Dororo stumbles across a village where the headman hoards all the food for himself and pretends to be a demon to scare off the other villagers. The monster Donburibara forces him to eat until his belly swells so it can enter his body through the navel to siphon off all his nourishment. Hyakkimaru arrives and starves the headman until Donburibara leaves, and he follows it to its origin, a giant tortoise. Dororo enlists the help of the villagers, and they help Hyakkimaru kill the demon. As the demon dies, Hyakkimaru recovers his second eye, making it the 28th demon.
18	"Bira-Bira the Sea Beast"; Transliteration: "Kaijū Bira Bira" (Japanese: 海獣ビラビラ)	August 3, 1969
Dororo and Hyakkimaru arrive at a fishing village where Dororo foolishly pulls an old harpoon out of some rocks. This releases a skeleton ray-monster called Bira-Bira that escapes into the sea. Dororo is challenged by a girl called Sayo who demands that he return the harpoon. Hyakkimaru dives into the sea following Bira-Bira, but he disappears. The villagers assume he is dead, so to calm Bira-Bira's anger, they send Dororo and the village girl into the sea as a sacrifice. When the demon attacks them, Hyakkimaru appears and destroys it, causing his teeth to be returned to him.
19	"The Thunder-fire Dog"; Transliteration: "Raika Ken (Rai Kake N)" (Japanese: 雷火犬（らいかけん）)	August 10, 1969
Hyakkimaru and Dororo encounter a wild dog which changes into the Thunder-fire Dog and forces Hyakkimaru over a cliff into a river. A villager finds Hyakkimaru and takes to his home, warning him about the demon dog. On the way, they pass a man cruelly beating his dog. Meanwhile the demon dog approaches Dororo and Nota, but it is friendly towards Nota. Hyakkimaru confronts the dog which transforms, but Nota stops Hyakkimaru and the dog departs. To Dororo's surprise, Hyakkimaru says that the dogs share a bond. Later, in the village they see the cruel man is forcing his dog to fight for money, which angers Dororo. That night Dororo puts medicine in the food of the fighting dogs so when the dog-fight starts the next day, the dogs are too sick to fight. The Thunder-fire Dog arrives in town and Hyakkimaru challenges and manages to kill it, but he takes no joy in taking the life of the animal that was possessed by a demon. Dororo finally understands how Nota feels and leaves some flowers on its grave.
20	"Onburaki"; Transliteration: "Onbu Ra Oni" (Japanese: おんぶら鬼)	August 17, 1969
Dororo applies for a well-paid babysitting job for a village headman, but Hyakkimaru detects the presence of a demon. Hyakkimaru falls into its trap, while the villagers pay their respects to the new babysitter, Dororo. During the night, the villagers tie Dororo to a statue known as the Jizo which first demands that Dororo sings a lullaby or be strangled, and then demands a piggy-back ride to the next village. Meanwhile, Hyakkimaru escapes from the demon's trap, and catches up with the statue and the spider-like demon inhabiting it. Hyakkimaru kills the demon and his backbone grows back into place.
21	"The Moth Mother"; Transliteration: "Maimaionba" (Japanese: まいまいおんば)	August 24, 1969
Hyakkimaru senses an unusual evil air when the warrior Sabame rides by with his wife Maimaiyonba inside a bullock-drawn wagon. Maimaionba also senses something extraordinary about Hyakkimaru, and asks Sabame to kill him. Hyakkimaru escapes the attack, however when the couple arrive home they find Dororo and Hyakkimaru there who refuse to leave. That night the travellers are attacked by a moth-like monster spraying silver powder, whom Hyakkimaru realizes is Maimaiyonba. In her storehouse they find Maimaionba's moth eggs. The following night they lay a trap, and after Dororo sets the monster on fire, Hyakkimaru kills it with his blades. After it dies, Hyakkimaru's leg grows back.
22	"The Demon Monmon"; Transliteration: "Yōkai Monmon" (Japanese: 妖怪もんもん)	August 31, 1969
Dororo and Hyakkimaru arrive at a deserted village with only one girl inhabitant called Ochii. She tells them that the villagers went to the mountains to look for gold and never returned. Ochii tells them she knows the location of the gold and Dororo eagerly goes with her to see it. Dororo grabs a bag full of gold, while Hyakkimaru who has followed Dororo into the mountains is attacked by the demon Momonga and falls into a river. Ochii is in fact Momon who has lured people into mountains by telling them about the gold, where they are eaten by huge slugs whose slime makes ordinary rocks look like gold. Hyakkimaru kills Ochii and then Dororo creates a fire which incinerates the slugs.
23	"The Great Man-eating Tree"; Transliteration: "Hito Gui Taiboku" (Japanese: 人食い大木)	September 7, 1969
Villagers refuse to cut down a 2,000 year old tree to make space for the construction of a samurai fortress. Hyakkimaru believes the tree is possessed by a demon and tries to cut it down with his sword, but his sword and then his arm is swallowed into the tree. Woodcutters are then ordered to chop down the tree, but when one agrees to help Dororo, he is also absorbed into the trunk. Later, when the trunk splits after floating downstream, the woodsman and Hyakkimaru are released, and the demon finally shows itself inhabiting the tree. The demon tree seems almost invulnerable, but Hyakkimaru sees its weakness and throws a spear into the spot housing the demon, killing it and causing the tree to burst into flames.
24	"Shike Nyuudou"; Transliteration: "Yon Ka (Shike) Nyūdō" (Japanese: 四化（しけ）入道)	September 14, 1969
Dororo's arm becomes caught in a fish-trap, and Hyakkimaru goes looking for help. He finds a nearby temple and meets the monk Nyudo Shiki who willingly lends him a tool, but when he returns to the river, Hyakkimaru finds Dororo gone and he challenges the suspicious monk who changes into a demon and escapes. Hyakkimaru then encounters a woodcutter who tells him that years ago, the monk refused to surrender the temple to a warrior general and was buried alive, but then mice, frogs, otters and weasels then attacked the general and saved the nearby villages. With the help of the woodcutter, Hyakkimaru rescues Dororo and kills the demon which bestows on Hyakkimaru the ability to feel heat, cold and pain within his body.
25	"The Demon Tsuchibouzu"; Transliteration: "Yōkai Do Bōzu" (Japanese: 妖怪土坊主)	September 21, 1969
Dororo and Hyakkimaru enter a city where a beggar named Gutaro has reportedly been sitting in the same place for ten years. He claims it is not out of laziness, but that he is keeping a monster underground. Hyakkimaru detects a demon, but Dororo stops him from killing Gutaro and promises to find a way to make the beggar move. After trying everything, Dororo drugs Gutaro and out of pity, washes his body, but this washes away a sutra written on his buttocks releasing the demon Tsuchibozu. Hyakkimaru then uses Gutaro as bait to attract the demon, which he eventually traps and kills. As the demon dies, Hyakkimaru recovers his skin.
26	"The Final Demon"; Transliteration: "Saigo No Yōkai" (Japanese: 最後の妖怪)	September 28, 1969
Dororo is outraged to see four samurai mistreating poor farmers and volunteers to join them. After they kill a child, Hyakkimaru intervenes and kills the samurai, but refuses to stay and help in the rebellion, leaving Dororo in the village and he departs. Hyakkimaru continues his journey alone, defeating one demon after another while Dororo participates in the rebellion. A year later, Hyakkimaru has only one more demon to kill to complete the list of 48 that he needs to recover his body. An old woman tells him that the last demon to slay is his father, Daigo Kagemitsu who sold his soul to the demons to gain power. Hyakkimaru then discovers that Kagemitsu is the lord against whom the farmers were rebelling, and surprisingly offers to join Kagemitsu, but when Kagemitsu orders Hyakkimaru to kill his prisoner Dororo to show his loyalty, Kagemitsu's wife Onui intervenes. In a fury, Kagemitsu kills her and then goes on a rampage, killing his own men. Hyakkimaru tells Dororo that he knows that she is a girl, and the she should grow up to be a mother living with the villagers. Hyakkimaru then chases after his father and kills Kagemitsu, claiming Jukai-sensei was the only real father he knew. As Hyakkimaru leaves, Dororo decides to stay in the village and make her own future there.

== See also ==
- Dororo (2019 TV series)
