= Dororo (film) =

- Film poster
- Directed by: Akihiko Shiota
- Screenplay by: Masa Nakamura; Akihiko Shiota
- Based on: Dororo by Osamu Tezuka
- Produced by: Takashi Hirano
- Starring: Satoshi Tsumabuki; Kō Shibasaki
- Cinematography: Takahide Shibanushi
- Edited by: Toshihide Fukano
- Music by: Goro Yasukawa; Yutaka Fukuoka
- Production company: Dentsu
- Distributed by: Toho
- Release date: 15 March 2007
- Running time: 139 minutes
- Country: Japan
- Language: Japanese
- Budget: ¥2 billion ($18.9 million)
- Box office: ¥3.45 billion ($27.3 million)

Dororo is a 2007 Japanese dark fantasy action film based on the 1960s manga series by Osamu Tezuka. Shot in New Zealand, the film's storyline has some major differences from that of the manga, one of which is that Hyakkimaru and Dororo are significantly older than their manga incarnations.

== Plot ==
Dororo is a young woman assuming the identity of a man despite others seeing through her brash and often violent exterior. When her father was killed by Daigo when he attempted to call the warlord out, the girl and her mother escaped into the wilderness. At her mother's dying request, in order to carry on her father's insurmountable vendetta against Daigo, the child takes on a man's identity and grows up without a permanent home or any friends. As a result, She becomes a thief to make a living. Throughout her life, she's denied any name, citing that the best thieves never revealed their names as doing so meant they could be hunted and arrested. Only after travelling with Hyakkimaru does she decide to take on the name "Dororo", as that name had been one of many that Hyakkimaru had acquired during his previous travels. Although Hyakkimaru explained it as meaning "Little Monster," Dororo felt that it suited her better while Hyakkimaru kept his previous name.

Abandoned at birth, Hyakkimaru's body was sold to demons by his birth father, resulting in his lacking 48 body parts. He only survives because he is discovered by a master spellcaster, who takes pity on him and replaces his missing body parts with those of deceased children. From a young age, Hyakkimaru attracts a disproportionate amount of attention from supernatural beings, especially malignant ones. This supernatural magnetism results in the death of his adopted father. Hyakkimaru is emotionally destroyed but begins questing to destroy the demons and regain the body stolen from him at birth.

Among the demons Hyakkimaru encounters are a Jorōgumo, the moth demoness Maimai´Onba (まいまいおんば) who abducted abandoned children in order to feed her Hanyō offspring, a cherry blossom tree monster and a lizard monster. After killing a Daitengu and regaining his right arm, Hyakkimaru learns that his curse was his birth father's doing and this man was in fact Daigo. Killing a pair of dog demons who tormented him about this revelation, Hyakkimaru gains his real eyes and is later confronted at daybreak by Tahōmaru, the man he learned to be his younger brother. Expressing jealous rage towards Hyakkimaru due to their mother's feelings for him, Tahōmaru's resulting anger brings about a confrontation in which he is accidentally killed by Hyakkimaru.

By then, Daigo arrives and cuts down his wife while she, despite her own despair over Tahōmaru's death, tries to persuade Daigo to spare Hyakkimaru's life, now their only living son. Though he came close to killing his father, Hyakkimaru refused and spared his father while telling him to strive for and create the utopia that he had once envisioned. However, with the promise of returning Tahōmaru to life, Daigo sold his body to one of the demons with whom he made the original pact. Dororo tried to convince Daigo not to do it, telling him that the demon would use his body to rule the land and cause greater despair and suffering among the people. Daigo accepted the proposal nonetheless, but was able to muster enough control to hold the monster at bay for Hyakkimaru to kill him. Once dead, Hyakkimaru regained his heart, yet complained that the pain in his chest did not subside afterward, an indication that he was feeling remorse for the first time in his life. Though later offered the throne, Hyakkimaru declines and entrusts his younger brother with it as he and Dororo continue their quest to kill the remaining two dozen demons.

== Cast ==
- Satoshi Tsumabuki - Hyakkimaru
- Eita Nagayama- Tahomaru
- Kō Shibasaki - Dororo
- Kiichi Nakai - Lord Kagemitsu Daigo
- Yoshio Harada - Jukai
- Eita- Tahomaru
- Mieko Harada - Yuri
- Katsuo Nakamura - Bipa
- Tetta Sugimoto - Sabame

== Accolades ==
Award nominations for Dororo
Year	Award	Category	Recipient	Result
2007	Sitges - Catalonian International Film Festival	Best Motion Picture	Akihiko Shiota	Won

== Remake ==
In 2012, it was announced that Better Luck Tomorrow producer Ernesto Foronda was set to make a Western adaptation of Dororo.
