= Dororo (2019 TV series) =

Japanese television anime series

- どろろ
- Type: TV series
- Genre: Action; Dark fantasy; Historical fantasy
- Based on: Dororo by Osamu Tezuka
- Directed by: Kazuhiro Furuhashi
- Series composition: Yasuko Kobayashi
- Character designers: Hiroyuki Asada; Satoshi Iwataki
- Music by: Yoshihiro Ike
- Voices of: Hiroki Suzuki; Rio Suzuki
- Opening themes: "Kaen" (火炎) by Queen Bee; "Dororo" (どろろ) by Asian Kung-Fu Generation
- Ending themes: "Sayonara Gokko" (さよならごっこ) by amazarashi; "Yamiyo" (闇夜) by Eve
- No. of episodes: 24 (list of episodes)

Production
- Art director: Mari Fujino
- Sound director: Kisuke Koizumi
- Cinematographer: Yoshihisa Oyama
- Color designer: Osamu Mikasa
- Animation producer: Rihito Matsunaga
- Studios: Tezuka Productions; MAPPA
- Twin Engine

Original release
- Networks: Tokyo MX, BS11
- Release: January 7 – June 24, 2019

Dororo (Japanese: どろろ) is a 2019 anime television series produced by Tezuka Productions and MAPPA based on the manga series Dororo by Osamu Tezuka, and is the second anime adaptation after the 1969 series. The adaptation departs from the source material in several ways, but follows the basic premise of the manga: a young rōnin, named Hyakkimaru, along with a young child, Dororo, must face multiple demons in Sengoku-era Japan who have stolen his various body parts in order to get them back.

The main innovation was the new portrayal of Hyakkimaru, a weaker samurai than the one written by Tezuka with director Kazuhiro Furuhashi among other staff member conceiving the alternate of take of the young swordsman becoming a new person following his journey with Dororo in a similar manner to buddy films. The series is also present in English release through Sentai Filmworks and Amazon Prime.

The series was well received by critics from anime who often listed it as one of the best anime from 2019. The characterization of Hyakkimaru and Dororo was often praised as well as how they develop and how the former's family is also explored. However, some writers felt some episodic narratives did not have the same appeal as the earlier ones.

== Plot ==
During the Muromachi period, a feudal lord has his newborn son's organs and limbs sacrificed to the twelve demon gods in exchange of prosperity for his people. The baby is abandoned but found by the doctor Jukai who specializes in giving people prosthetic limbs. Jukai adopts the baby and gives him limbs. When the child grows up, he is attacked by demons and develops the ability of seeing their silhouette to fight back. After defeating his first enemy, the now teenager regains his ability to feel pain. Jukai names him Hyakkimaru and he leaves on a journey to regain his body. Along the way, Hyakkimaru meets a child named Dororo who decides to follow him, teaching him how to live and fight demons in exchange for food when visiting villages.

As the duo fight demons, Hyakkimaru recovers his hearing which causes him to fall in love with the young singer, Mio, who had been selling her body to soldiers. Believing she is a spy, enemy soldiers kill her and the orphans in her care. This ignites a deep rage within Hyakkimaru, and he kills all but one of the soldiers. Dororo calms him and gives him a bag of rice seeds from the late girl, which he stores in his clothing. Hyakkimaru also meets his family: his father Daigo Kagemitsu, his mother Nui no Kata and his younger brother Tahomaru. As Daigo fears the land will be destroyed once Hyakkimaru recovers his body, he and his son attempt to kill him without success. As Hyakkimaru and Dororo continue their journey, the former becomes obsessed with recovering his body which scares the latter when a village is destroyed. Jukai makes Hyakkimaru realize that he needs a person to rely on to avoid being lost in wrath and Hyakkimaru chooses Dororo who had left him following a disagreement. Hyakkimaru goes to find Dororo who has now been captured by bandits who want to recover Dororo's father's hidden treasure.

Although now feeling more affection towards Dororo, Hyakkimaru succumbs to his wrath when he is unable to save Dororo, who nearly drowns, because he does not have real arms. Hyakkkimaru returns to Daigo's village to recover his last body parts and once again battles Tahomaru and his assistants Mutsu and Hyogo after the three made a pact with the demons to kill him- resulting in Mutsu and Hyogo receiving one of Hyakkimaru's arms and Tahomaru receiving his eyes. As Mutsu and Hyogo die, Hyakkimaru recovers his arms and fights Tahomaru in his castle on fire. Through his brother's despair, Hyakkimaru sees parallels between their lives and spares him. Tahomaru rips off his eyes to make Hyakkimaru recover his vision and Nui no Kata and Jukai lead him to Dororo as they die in the castle with Tahomaru. With Daigo's land destroyed, the feudal lord attempts to offer his son once again when Hyakkimaru spares him as he claims both can redeem themselves from killing people. Dororo then uses her father's treasure to rebuild the village while Hyakkimaru goes on a journey to accomplish Mio's dream of a field. The series ends with the grown Dororo running to happily welcome the returning Hyakkimaru.

=== Main cast ===
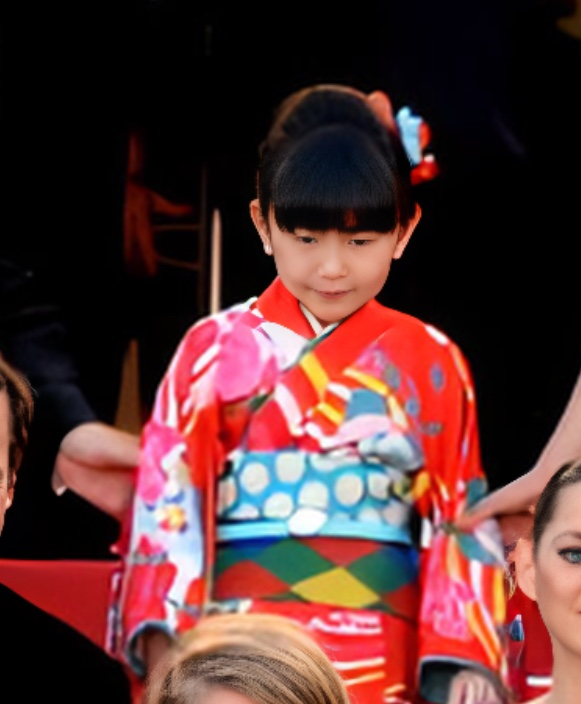
Rio Suzuki voices the title character.

- Hyakkimaru (Voiced by: Hiroki Suzuki (Japanese); Adam Gibbs (English)): Due to his character's limited dialogue, MAPPA provided Suzuki with multiple directions during the recording sessions. He particularly enjoyed the varying emotional range Hyakkimaru employed when beginning to call Dororo by name. Suzuki compared the duo's relationship to that in a buddy film and interpreted the series' message as concerning humanity, noting that Hyakkimaru grew weaker with each body part he regained. Suzuki felt Hyakkimaru's initial voice sounded too much like an ikemen and was instructed to moderate his performance. The actor stated that Hyakkimaru never aimed to sound cool and was more endearing during his interactions with Dororo, especially following their reunion in the series' latter half after a period of separation.
- Dororo (Voiced by: Rio Suzuki (Japanese); Chaney Moore (English)): Suzuki expressed feeling pressure as the youngest actor in the series, but anticipated her character's developing relationship with Hyakkimaru and their shared journey.
- Biwamaru (Voiced by: Mutsumi Sasaki (Japanese); James Belcher (English))
- Daigo Kagemitsu (Voiced by: Naoya Uchida (Japanese); David Wald (English))
- Tahōmaru (Voiced by: Shōya Chiba (Japanese); Blake Jackson (English))
- Jukai (Voiced by: Akio Otsuka (Japanese); Ty Mahany (English)): Otsuka previously voiced Daigo in the 2004 video game adaption.
- Nuinokata (Voiced by: Chie Nakamura (Japanese); Patricia Duran (English))

== Production ==
=== Concept ===
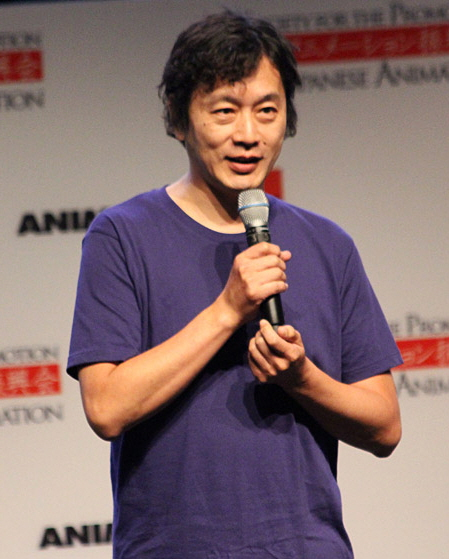
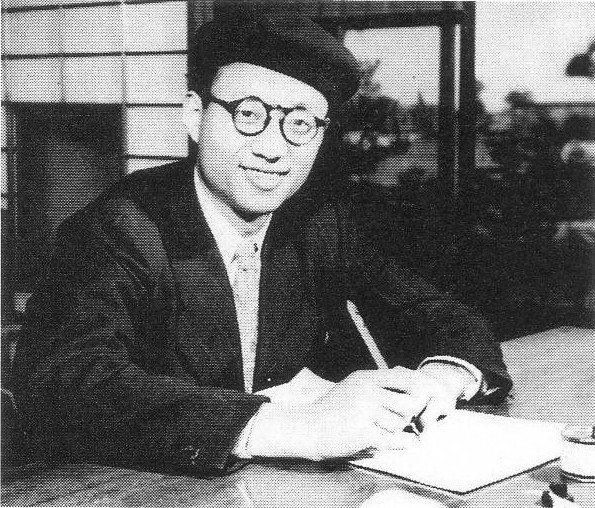
Kazuhiro Furuhashi (left) directed the Dororo anime based on Osamu Tezuka's work.

According to producer (Note: Credited as "Produce" (プロデュース) rather than as a "Producer" (プロデューサー)) Manabu Otsuka, the central appeal of the Dororo anime was the dynamic between the two main characters, Hyakkimaru and Dororo. While the duo was also a focus of the original manga, their relationship in the adaptation was significantly redeveloped, with Hyakkimaru gradually recognizing Dororo's existence as he regained parts of his body. Otsuka noted that despite the series' dark themes, the interactions between the two characters provided a sense of relief for viewers. To ensure the designs would appeal to a modern audience, Otsuka held discussions with draft artist Hiroyuki Asada and character designer Satoshi Iwataki. Iwataki blended the soft, rounded expressiveness of Tezuka's style with Asada's artwork to facilitate Dororo's animated movement, with a conscious effort to emphasize the character's cuteness. Otsuka, a self-described fan of Tezuka's works, expressed particular satisfaction that Kazuhiro Furuhashi was appointed director, citing his prior experience on Rurouni Kenshin and Altair: A Record of Battles.

=== Scenario ===
The character design phase was noted as one of the most challenging aspects of production. Hiroyuki Asada, a fan of Tezuka's work, was enlisted for the task. Writer Yasuko Kobayashi admitted to being unfamiliar with the original manga at the time. Asada's initial design for Hyakkimaru depicted an older character, but following feedback from director Furuhashi that the design contained too many "Egui expressions" and should be cuter, Asada revised his approach to align more closely with Tezuka's original depiction. Kobayashi found that the final designs made it easier to empathize with the characters during storyboard and script development. In contrast, designing Dororo was considered less difficult than Hyakkimaru. Kobayashi also emphasized the impact of music on the series' tone, noting that the minimalist artwork was effectively complemented by a heavy, dramatic score.

Director Kazuhiro Furuhashi described the series as a difficult production, particularly in portraying a younger and more naive version of Hyakkimaru than in the 1969 adaptation. While the narrative was composed of episodic stories, Furuhashi integrated several focused on Daigo's family to intertwine with the central journey of Hyakkimaru and Dororo. To handle the setting accurately, Furuhashi studied other works by Osamu Tezuka and collaborated with writer Yasuko Kobayashi. A key narrative decision was for Hyakkimaru to first regain the body part that allows him to feel pain. Furuhashi preferred to convey the series' themes through subtext and character dynamics rather than explicit exposition, citing episode 18 and the evolving relationship between the two protagonists as examples of this approach, which was designed to facilitate Hyakkimaru's character development.

Designer Hiroyuki Asada explained that Hyakkimaru's slender body frame was a deliberate choice to evoke the image of a "ball-jointed doll", and his thin eyebrows were also intentional. Voice actor Akio Otsuka, who portrayed Jukai, contrasted the series' narrative choices with more conventional ones, noting that the decision to have Hyakkimaru's healthy leg chewed away, rather than a prosthetic, was emblematic of the adaptation's distinctive style.

=== Audio ===
Producer Manabu Otsuka, who had a prior working relationship with composer Yoshihiro Ike dating back to a 2016 stage play, quickly secured him for the project. Sound director Kisuke Koizumi stated that a defining characteristic of Dororo was its minimal use of background music, with only 30 pieces composed for the two-cours series. This was a deliberate choice to prioritize dialogue and facial expressions for conveying emotion. The music that was used was described as epic to suit the period drama setting. Significant effort was also placed on detailed sound effects, such as the subtle noise of a character taking a step, to enhance the viewing experience. Ike noted that the multiple specific requests for the soundtrack presented a challenge.

The first opening theme, "Kaen" (火炎), was performed by Queen Bee, and the first ending theme, "Sayonara Gokko" (さよならごっこ), was performed by amazarashi. The concept for "Kaen" involved a dancing metaphor based on the singer's background, which coincidentally aligned with the anime's depiction of Hyakkimaru seeing human souls as flames. The production staff requested a greater emphasis on Japanese musical instruments; in response, the band crafted choral sections to mimic the sound of such instruments and incorporated a rap segment. The ending theme "Sayonara Gokko" was noted for its mellow sound and lyrics that reflected Hyakkimaru's perspective.

For the second half of the series, the opening theme "Dororo" (どろろ) was performed by Asian Kung-Fu Generation, and the second ending theme "Yamiyo" (闇夜) was performed by Eve. Masafumi Gotoh of Asian Kung-Fu Generation stated that he composed the music with the intent of honoring the original Tezuka manga. Eve described his song as portraying Hyakkimaru's struggle with his cursed existence, his loneliness, his growing sense of self, and the new emotions arising from his bond with Dororo, all set in a "world of being eaten or eaten."

== Themes ==
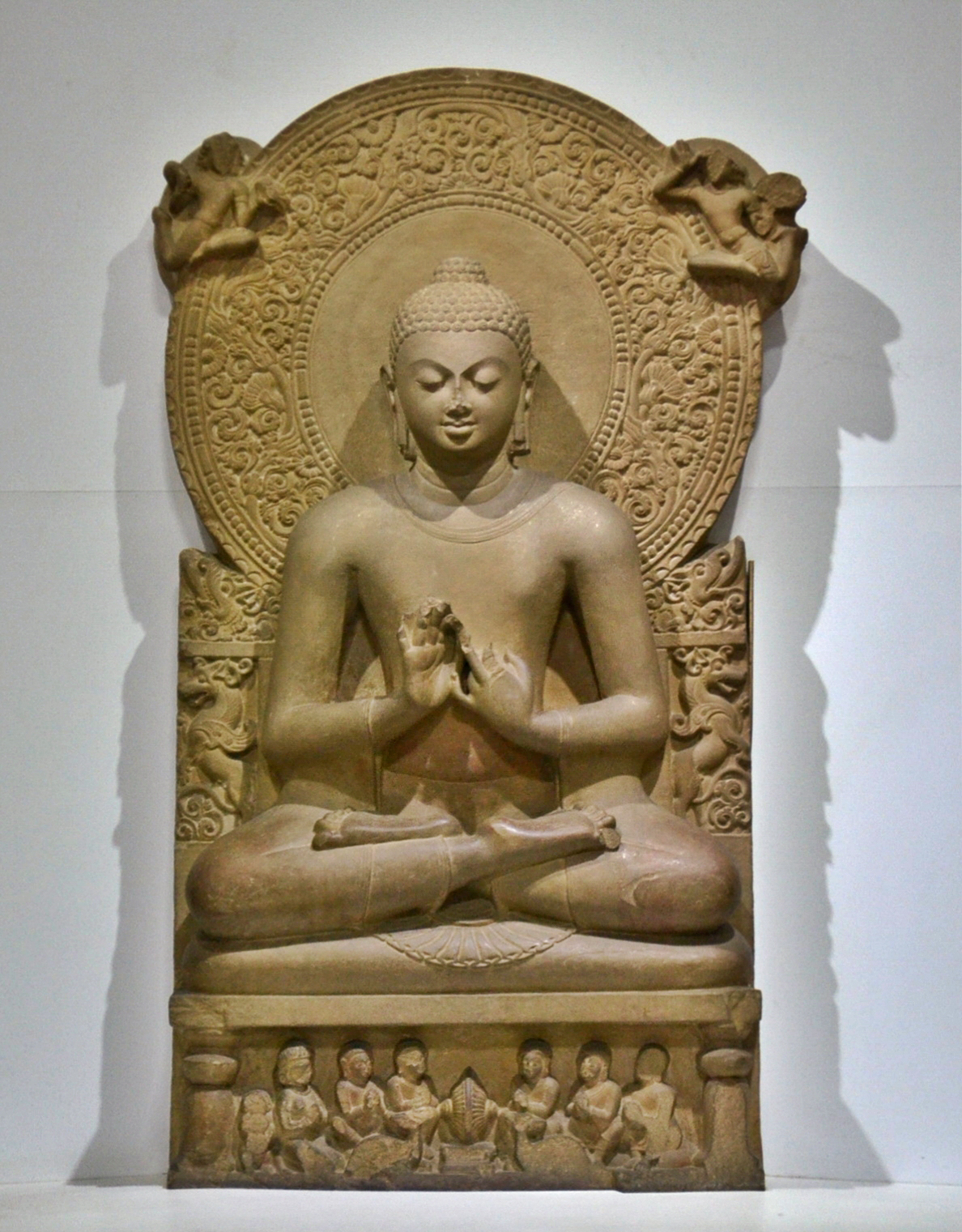
The series explores themes of fate and religion

Set during the chaotic Sengoku period, the anime explored the tragedy of war and humanity's devotion to religion. Writing for Crunchyroll, Blake Planty observed the series' heavy focus on Buddhism, noting that demons threatening society often resulted in violent confrontations. Planty noted that in this context, Hyakkimaru's heroism was complicated by socio-political stakes, with Daigo's pact with demons representing shifting Buddhist attitudes toward such entities.

Marco Oliveros of Anime News Network highlighted the narrative's engagement with the damage caused by the Ōnin War, noting that the anime frequently addressed war victims regardless of age, with poverty being a common condition among villagers. He explained that while belief in yōkai predated the arrival of Buddhism in Japan, the two were never mutually exclusive, much like how Japanese Emperors historically served as both high Shinto priests and devoted Buddhist practitioners. Oliveros observed that although Daigo offered his son to the yōkai, Buddhist influence still saved the newborn child from a dark fate, symbolized in the first episode by a Bodhisattva Kannon statue losing its head when Hyakkimaru was saved from being consumed.

Kalli Wallace of Tor.com drew parallels between Hyakkimaru's life and the narratives of Ursula K. Le Guin, particularly regarding how Daigo used his son's body as a bargain for his land's prosperity. Wallace noted that while Hyakkimaru's quest to reclaim his body potentially returned chaos to the world, he refused to remain a sacrificial figure, expressing a desire to escape a life of pain. This stance created conflict with figures like Jukai, who feared his adoptive son's descent into violence, and Dororo, who was himself a war victim. Wallace further compared the tragic world of Dororo to Le Guin's The Ones Who Walk Away from Omelas, noting that characters across both stories expressed regret over the choices that led to Hyakkimaru's suffering, conveying a message about the importance of children's self-expression.

Richard Eisenbeis of Biggest in Japan analyzed Hyakkimaru's journey as an inversion of the hero's journey; rather than becoming stronger, he grew weaker as he fought with an increasingly human body. Eisenbeis cited the protagonist's tragic relationship with Mio and his friendship with Dororo as major narrative strengths that fundamentally altered his personality, allowing Hyakkimaru to develop his own identity through his struggles.

== Release ==
The 24-episode series was broadcast from January 7 to June 24, 2019, on Tokyo MX, BS11, and Jidaieki Senmon Channel, and was streamed exclusively worldwide on Amazon Prime Video. The episodes were collected in two Blu-ray volumes released in Japan on May 22 and August 21, 2019.

Kazuhiro Furuhashi directed the series, with Yasuko Kobayashi handling series composition, Satoshi Iwataki handling character designs, and Yoshihiro Ike composing the music. Twin Engine produced the series. The soundtrack of the series was released on August 14, 2019, in two different editions. A guidebook featuring Hiroyuki Asada's art was released in Japan on August 2, 2019.

The series was licensed by Sentai Filmworks for an English release in March 2021. Sentai's deal includes distribution rights for the United States, Canada, United Kingdom, Australia, New Zealand, South Africa, Latin America, Spain, Portugal, the Netherlands, and Nordic and Scandinavian countries. The Blu-ray disk of the series was released by Sentai on June 29, 2021. Madman Entertainment released it in Australia on October 6, 2021. Medialink licensed the series in Southeast Asia and streamed it on Ani-One Asia YouTube channel.

== Reception ==
=== Popularity ===
Anime News Network listed Dororo as one of the best MAPPA series of all time, and was also listed as one of the best anime from 2019. The first Blu-ray volume sold 1,912 units in Japan. At the 4th Crunchyroll Anime Awards, Hyakkimaru was nominated for both Best Protagonist and Best Boy while "Sayonara Gokko" was one of the nominees for Best Ending Sequence. Satoshi Iwataki was also nominated for Best Character Design. Only Iwataki won in a Dororo vote. Forbes also listed Dororo as one of the best series from its decade. Thrillist regarded it as one of the best anime series in Amazon Prime. Thrillist named the series as one of the best anime of the 2010s, CL praising the action sequences, themes and visuals.

=== Critical response ===
Early impressions of the series were positive with the handling of MAPPA's animation, the alterations to Hyakkimaru's portrayal and origins in comparison to Osamu Tezuka's manga and Dororo's personality. The handling of the tragic relationship between Hyakkimaru and Mio earned similar response as the former is suddenly developed when meeting Mio though the dark twist was noted that it could negatively affect his future as well as the latter's occupation as a prostitute which was deemed too dark. Although the narrative uses the idea of villain of the week, RiceDigital and Popzara noted that Hyakkimaru changed almost in every episode due to he builds his own identity as he regains parts of his body, noting his meeting with Mio heavily affected his desire to restore his own body rather than defend his own body.

Dororo's backstory was also noted tragic not only for how the young child suffered following the death of his parents and it was shown how he created a stronger personality in order to fight for her life, acting like a male rather than a girl, though Fandom Post found it as obvious knowledge for the audience. His eventual reunion with the bandit Itachi who plans to steal his father's treasure using the map hidden on the child's back was noted for the story more moral tones as despite Itachi's cruel nature, the two protect one another from the young Shiranui. Despite Shiranui's twisted nature as he uses shark-like demons to feed on his preys, he still shows love towards them in tragic tones when Hyakkimaru kills one of them. These episodes were also noted to show the kind nature of the two leads, most notably Hyakkimaru as he shows more affection towards Dororo and Jukai. Dororo's continuous dynamic with Hyakkimaru as well as the growth of Hyakkimaru's younger brother, Tahomaru, were also praised as interesting subplots fow how the build up the main story.

In regards to the series' ending, Manga.Tokyo said he did not look forward to Hyakkimaru's hatred towards Daigo as he still enjoyed deep bond between the leads rather than a possible tragedy. The series' finale felt rushed by Anime News Network for how Dororo's gender issues were not properly explored which is left ambiguous when Hyakkimaru compliments his look upon recovering his sight. Nevertheless, he praised the conclusion between Hyakkimaru's arc in regards to his family as he spares his brother and father, something that works as a result of his growth as a person. Fandom Post had similar commentaries in regards to Hyakkimaru's family and whether or not his mother needed to die in the fire as well as whether or not the continuous wars from the Sengoku will bring more harm the leads' life. In conclusion, the reviewer praised how MAPPA managed to improve on Tezuka's original manga by changing the characterization of the two leads despite noting issues in the series' production. Popzara enjoyed the series' animation because of how gruesome fights tend to be. Fandom Post noted that while some episodic stories work out, the series suffers fatigue in the second half as the characters focused stories felt stronger than the scenario and sometimes felt that Hyakkimaru was too overpowered when fighting demons.

Although the animation remained consistently praised, the animation direction in Osamu Kobayashi's the televised airing of the 15th episode was not as positively received. Despite enjoying the scenario, UK Anime Network said that Dororo could have "from having a less staccato narrative" as well as a more balanced storytelling. He still recommended the series to Berserk and Demon Slayer: Kimetsu no Yaiba fans due to the heavy fights and narrative style.
