= Blood Will Tell =

2004 video game

- North American cover art
- Developers: Sega; Red Entertainment
- Publisher: Sega
- Director: Kenichi Imaeda
- Designer: Masamoto Morita
- Artists: Hiroaki Samura (character design/cover art); Mahiro Maeda (Fiend design); Keita Amemiya (logo design)
- Composer: Isao Tomita
- Series: Dororo
- Platform: PlayStation 2
- Release: JP: September 9, 2004; NA: September 21, 2004; EU: June 5, 2005
- Genre: Action-adventure
- Modes: Single-player, multiplayer

Blood Will Tell: Tezuka Osamu's Dororo, released as Dororo (どろろ) in Japan, is a 2004 PlayStation 2 game released by Sega. It is based on the Japanese manga series Dororo, which was created by Osamu Tezuka. It concerns a hero named Hyakkimaru, who has had much of his body stolen by forty-eight fiends, and has prosthetic replacements. Along with his ally, the thief Dororo, Hyakkimaru must defeat all forty-eight fiends.

== Story ==
The game is divided into nine parts:

=== Prologue: Hyakkimaru ===
Both Dororo and Hyakkimaru are playable characters. After a tutorial in which Jyukai teaches Hyakkimaru (and the player) how to use his weapons, Hyakkimaru reaches an isolated village attacked by demons led by a fiend, the Great Horn. After slaying the fiend, Hyakkimaru gets back his vocal cords, and a cutscene shows the player the story of Hyakkimaru's birth.

The land was in the midst of a war created by the fiends. One day, the heaven gods decided to send a child, a Chosen One, to slay the fiends. The demon gods counter-attacked by corrupting the child's father, samurai Kagemitsu Daigo. In exchange for "the power to bring back peace to the land", each of the fiends takes a body part from the baby, who is then abandoned by his father.

After the cutscene, Hyakkimaru saves a group of people from demons. A girl from the group introduces herself as "the world famous thief" Dororo. This thief is later saved by the samurai from another fiend, the Homonculus. Hyakkimaru earns his left eye, gaining his vision (reflected in-game by the display becoming full color; until this point, everything has been in greyscale, representing how Hyakkimaru perceives the world with his "inner eye"). Afterward, he tells Dororo what he knows of his past.

He had been found and raised by a physician, Jyukai, who built his prosthetic body parts. At the age of 18, Hyakkimaru heard a voice from the heavens, who told him that the fiends created a human with the stolen body parts, and that Hyakkimaru could get back what was stolen from him if he killed the forty-eight fiends or their human creation.

=== Chapter 1: Yudai ===
Hyakkimaru and Dororo come across a small, poor village full of people who are led by a woman named Mistress Yudai, who is actually a fiend who steals their money. Mistress Yudai has three forms: a kindly woman, a large ugly demon named Scourge, and another demon form named Ogress. A troll spirit helped the villagers find their money in a bamboo thicket, but Mistress Yudai demanded that anyone who saw this troll be brought to her and executed. Unbeknownst to the villagers however it is to keep her secret hidden.

=== Chapter 2: Dragon Brood ===
After defeating Yudai, Hyakkimaru and Dororo come across a ronin named Tanosuke in a desert-like area. This ronin wields a sword known as Dragon Brood, which is possessed by one of the fiends that had stolen Hyakkimaru's body parts. After Hyakkimaru defeats the masterless samurai, he flees. Dororo follows him and steals his sword. Dragon Brood tells Dororo to kill to satisfy its thirst for blood, which causes Dororo to attack Tanosuke's sister Misaki. However, Hyakkimaru arrives in time to take the sword out of Dororo's hands. Tanosuke reclaims the sword and fights Hyakkimaru, but sacrifices himself to Dragon Brood after being defeated again. Hyakkimaru destroys the blade and regains his spine, overwhelming Misaki with grief for her brother in the process. Misaki angrily calls Hyakkimaru a murderer, to which he responds, telling Misaki to not let Tanosuke's sacrifice go to waste. Hyakkimaru and Dororo head forward as Misaki grieves the loss of her brother.

=== Chapter 3: In the Belly of the Mountain ===
Hyakkimaru and Dororo travel to Daidara Mountain and arrive at a temple, where they meet Tahoumaru and Kagemitsu Daigo. Afterward, they come to a village and see Daigo and the magistrate. Dororo follows the magistrate to his hideout in a nearby cave, where she is knocked out and captured after seeing the magistrate eating. Hyakkimaru rescues Dororo, whereupon they return to the mountain to fight various parts of the massive demon concealed within, Mountainous. After defeating the demon, Hyakkimaru gains his sense of pain. In-game, this means whenever you're hit, the controller will rumble.

=== Chapter 4: The Wall ===
Hyakkimaru and Dororo arrive at a place known as "The Wall". It is here that he meets Snake Eyes Saburota, and again encounters Daigo and Tahoumaru. He fights a three-tailed fox, then fights a group of soldiers and saves two children, whom Dororo guides home. While she is doing this, Hyakkimaru finds Daigo's manor, where he fights the six-tailed fox. After the battle, Hyakkimaru is temporarily trapped by barriers set up by the "nine-tailed fox". After destroying the barriers, he fights Saburota in a battle which is cut short. He returns to the town and fights Tahoumaru, whom he falsely believes he has knocked out. The nine-tailed fox appears and tells him that the man is his brother. Hyakkimaru also realizes that Daigo is his father. Tahoumaru helps Hyakkimaru defeat the fox, but threatens to kill him if he interferes with Daigo's plans.

=== Chapter 5: Legion ===
Hyakkimaru, out of concern for Dororo's safety, dissolves their partnership and continues up a snowy path alone, killing demons as he goes. Dororo, meanwhile, finds a temple with an odd old man caretaking it. After sneaking into the basement, Dororo discovers a cult of literally faceless individuals worshipping a Fiend called Legion, who has collected all their faces and uses their endless suffering to increase his power. After telepathically informing Hyakkimaru of the discovery (and Dororo's capture), Hyakkimaru makes his way to a frozen waterfall and defeats Legion. Along the way he is hounded by the distraught Misaki (from Chapter 2) who has still not forgiven Hyakkimaru for killing her brother, Tanosuke, and continues to attack him. After Dororo and Hyakkimaru reunite and defeat the old man (the latter of which is another Fiend known as Redcap), they escape the mountain. Defeating Redcap earns Hyakkimaru his left arm, meaning your double arm-blade style is replaced by the ability to wield a katana along with your right arm blade. Snake Eyes Saburota has been keeping tabs on the two protagonists throughout this, however, and has plans for the revenge-obsessed Misaki.

=== Chapter 6: Gates of Hell ===
After one last fight with Misaki, who we learn, in her desire for the power to defeat Hyakkimaru and avenge her brother, was implanted with a fiend at the hands of Saburota (who flees and can be fought at the area in chapter 2 where Possessed Dororo was fought. Here Misaki will be fully possessed, so you can use any weapon on her. Defeating her earns Hyakkimaru his right leg, meaning he now carries his leg cannon when firing, giving it an attack boost and twice the ammo). Saburota challenges Hyakkimaru to discover the truth of his curse at the nearby village's cursed temple, known colloquially as "The Gates of Hell". After passing through the demon-infested town and a cursed forest that causes wanderers to become lost, Hyakkimaru and Dororo come across the Gates of Hell. Dororo is separated from Hyakkimaru and sneaks into the temple from the roof using the nearby architecture. They fight off a Fiend-possessed horse of Daigo's named Midoro before Hyakkimaru learns the truth about his curse. After confronting Daigo, Hyakkimaru and Dororo leave the temple and the town.

=== Chapter 7: Tragedy ===
Deciding to fight Daigo and his ambitions, Hyakkimaru and Dororo make it to Daigo's impressive castle built with slave labor over Chapter 4's North Town. Working their way through the traps, Dororo splits off to rescue the slave workers in the basement (as well as a reformed Tahoumaru, who has decided to help the duo) while Hyakkimaru goes on ahead and defeats more Fiends. He also meets Saburota for the last time, who reveals he was created by the Fiends to fight Hyakkimaru but is not the human composed of his body parts that Hyakkimaru was told about by the voice. This person created by the body parts of Hyakkimaru is revealed to be, in fact, Dororo. At the top of the tower, Hyakkimaru must fight his father after he is possessed by five Fiends at once, creating the monstrous Chimera. As it is composed of five fiends, defeating it grants five body parts: the gall bladder, the thymus gland, the diaphragm, the lacrimal glands, and the pituitary gland His father survives, but the ghosts of all the dead Fiends then surge towards Dororo. They are instead intercepted by a protective Tahoumaru. Hyakkimaru then must kill his possessed brother to rid the world of the Fiends once and for all. The tragedy convinces Daigo to pursue more peaceful solutions to unifying the country.

=== Chapter 8: Dororo ===
Unlocked upon destroying every single hidden Fiend, collecting all 47 body parts. Because Hyakkimaru was reluctant to kill Dororo for the last body part (his right arm), he has spent the next five years to build up his spiritual energy sufficiently to draw out the Fiend from Dororo and defeat it. Dororo in the meantime has grown to become a beautiful young warrior maiden. Hyakkimaru performs the exorcism technique and confronts the Fiend contained within her: the largest Fiend yet, the Behemoth. Hyakkimaru defeats the Fiend straight after, recovers his arm and embraces the successfully exorcised Dororo.

== Characters ==
- Hyakkimaru - A cursed samurai which 48 parts of his body parts were given to the 48 Fiends in exchange of their demonic powers offered to Kagemitsu Daigo, now the young samurai wants to slay all 48 fiends and recover his body, becoming a normal human.
- Dororo - A young thief who follows Hyakkimaru, out of interest and the possibility of wealth (and a sword). Each chapter of the game has a sequence where you control Dororo, and she defeats one of the Fiends (Dragon Tank) by herself.
- The 48 Fiends - A legion of demons who entered into a pact with Kagemitsu Daigo to rule the world, using him as their puppet.
- Kagemitsu Daigo - A feudal lord who sold 48 parts of the body of his son (Hyakkimaru) to the Fiends in exchange for power and invulnerability which allowed him to win numerous battles.
- Tahoumaru - An honorable young man who is Daigo's son and Hyakkimaru's brother. Though initially at odds with Hyakkimaru after he disrespects Daigo, he learns the truth of his brother's relation to him and the curse he suffers from and decides to help him.
- Snake Eyes Saburota - Initially a carefree ronin who rooms with Hyakkimaru and Dororo at one night, Saburota wants to join Daigo for some unexplained reason. He is later revealed to be a minion of the Fiends and works for them to earn himself a heart.
- Jyukai - A kindly doctor and science genius who found and saved Hyakkimaru when he was just an infant, Jyukai was coming from China and he found the infant Hyakkimaru hanging on a beg in a river, Jyukai raised him and restored Hyakkimaru's missing body parts with prostheses and powerful weaponry like machine guns and cannons.
- Mistress Yudai - Initially believed to be a benevolent rich woman who helps a village when they're at their most destitute, she is actually a Fiend who has been preying on the same village for centuries, perpetuating a cycle of theft and reimbursement to keep the village miserable and poor. Her unusual longevity causes no suspicion with the villagers, who believe her to be an angelic being.
- Tanosuke - A once honorable young samurai who became corrupted after his Lord commanded him to kill the castle's staff. His sword became possessed by a blood-thirsty Fiend and he reveled in the destruction he caused. He eventually mustered enough self-will to deprive the sword of more blood by killing himself with it.
- Misaki - A kind and beautiful maiden who becomes obsessed with revenge after her brother (possessed by a demonic sword) is slain by Hyakkimaru, in truth her brother offered himself to the demonic sword, Dragon Brood which killed him, Hyakkimaru tried to save him but was too late, now Misaki seeks Hyakkimaru. In the end she realises that Hyakkimaru is not a murderer and she thanks him for everything.
- Mio - A young but precocious teenage girl, orphaned by the war, who takes care of younger fellow orphans in an old temple. She believes there is a peaceful solution to the current war-torn country. Her last words to Hyakkimaru in the end was to make the world more peaceful with no war and suffering, she then dies at the hands of a Fiend (Gaping Maw).
- The Magistrate - A greedy, overweight magistrate who has been eating the food stolen from the starving village he governs. He's actually possessed by a gluttonous Fiend who kills him after they separate.
- Mai-Mai Onba - A hidden Fiend with no strong influence on the game's plot, Mai-Mai Onba is a powerful moth Fiend. Her last words are the name of her human lover from the manga, Lord Sabame.

== Reception ==
Reception

Aggregate score
Aggregator	Score
Metacritic	67/100

Review scores
Publication	Score
Edge	6/10
Electronic Gaming Monthly	6.83/10
Eurogamer	7/10
Famitsu	30/40
Game Informer	5/10
GamePro	3.5/5
GameRevolution	C−
GameSpot	7.3/10
GameSpy	3.5/5
GameZone	6/10
IGN	6.8/10
Official U.S. PlayStation Magazine	4/5
The Sydney Morning Herald	3.5/5

The game received "average" reviews according to the review aggregation website Metacritic. In Japan, Famitsu gave it a score of 30 out of 40.
