= Dororo =

Japanese manga series by Osamu Tezuka and its franchise

- Manga volume 1 cover (1981 Osamu Tezuka Manga Complete Works edition)

どろろ
- Genre: Action; Dark fantasy; Historical fantasy
- Manga
- Written by: Osamu Tezuka
- Published by: Shogakukan; Akita Shoten
- English publisher: NA: Vertical
- Imprint: Akita Sunday Comics
- Magazine: Weekly Shōnen Sunday (1967–1968); Bōken Ō (1969)
- Original run: August 1967 – October 1969
- Volumes: 4
- Anime television series
- Dororo (1969); Dororo (2019)
- Video game
- Blood Will Tell (2004)
- Live-action film
- Dororo (2007)
- Manga
- Dororo to Enma-kun (2012–2014); Search and Destroy (2018–2020); The Legend of Dororo and Hyakkimaru (2018–2025)
- icon

Dororo (どろろ) is a Japanese manga series written and illustrated by Osamu Tezuka. Tezuka's childhood memory of his friends pronouncing dorobō (どろぼう; "thief") as dororo inspired the title of the series. Dororo was first serialized in Shogakukan's Weekly Shōnen Sunday between August 1967 and July 1968, before being cancelled. The manga was then concluded in Akita Shoten's Bōken'ō magazine in 1969. The story revolves around the rōnin samurai Hyakkimaru and child thief Dororo on their journey through Sengoku era Japan.

A 26-episode anime television series adaptation produced by Mushi Productions aired in 1969. The anime series bears the distinction of being the first entry in what is now known as the World Masterpiece Theater series (Calpis Comic Theater at the time). Dororo was also made into a live-action film in 2007. A 24-episode second anime television series adaptation by MAPPA and Tezuka Productions aired from January to June 2019.

== Plot ==
During the Sengoku period, a rōnin named Hyakkimaru (百鬼丸) wanders the land alongside a young orphaned thief named Dororo (どろろ). Hyakkimaru is born severely disfigured, lacking limbs, facial features, and internal organs as a result of a pact made by his father, the daimyō Kagemitsu Daigō, with 48 demons. In exchange for power and prosperity over his domain, Kagemitsu offers the demons anything they desire from him, allowing them to wreak havoc upon the land. To save him from execution, Hyakkimaru's mother, Nui no Kata, sets him adrift on a river, where Jukai, a skilled medicine man, discovers and raises him. Jukai crafts prostheses for the child using the remains of deceased war orphans, rendering him nearly invulnerable to mortal injuries. Embedded within his left arm is a mystical blade, gifted by a traveling storyteller who believes it destined for Hyakkimaru due to the doctor's frequent encounters with goblins since finding the boy. The blade, forged for vengeance against supernatural beings, becomes a vital weapon in Hyakkimaru's quest. Forced to leave Jukai after attracting demons, Hyakkimaru learns from a spectral voice that slaying the demons will restore his stolen body parts. Over time, he earns the name Hyakkimaru for his fearsome, inhuman nature.

During his travels, Hyakkimaru encounters Dororo, a young thief who joins him in traversing the war-torn countryside. By then, Hyakkimaru has already slain 15 demons. As their journey continues, he vanquishes six more, gradually reclaiming fragments of his humanity. Along the way, Dororo's past is revealed: the child's father, the bandit Hibukuro, steals wealth from oppressive samurai and hides it at Bone Cape, intending to distribute it among the suffering populace. Betrayed by his subordinate Itachi, Hibukuro is crippled but manages to escape with his wife, Ojiya, and their child. Though Hibukuro perishes aiding their flight, Ojiya, fearing her own death, prays to Buddha and inscribes a map in her own blood to guide Dororo to the treasure before succumbing to the cold.

Itachi later captures Dororo, using the map on the child's back to locate Bone Cape. A mysterious boatman ferries them, accompanied by two demonic sharks that attack the bandits. Though one shark devours half of Itachi's men, Dororo and the survivors kill the creature. When the boatman returns with the second shark, Hyakkimaru intervenes, wounding the beast before it flees. After landing, the boatman lures the remaining bandits to a poisoned spring, leaving only Itachi, Dororo, and Hyakkimaru. Discovering the corpses, Hyakkimaru slays the shark and the boatman, regaining his voice in the process. Itachi searches for the treasure but finds only a letter from Hibukuro stating it has been moved. When corrupt magistrates arrive under false pretenses, Hyakkimaru, Dororo, and Itachi fight them off, though Itachi is left mortally wounded.

Later, Hyakkimaru learns that his father has been possessed by the remaining demons and seeks to confront him. The Daigō domain has fallen into ruin, with enslaved citizens forced to construct a fortress. Though the slaves plot rebellion, a traitor alerts Kagemitsu, who massacres them with archers. The survivors retreat into a hidden tunnel. Hyakkimaru infiltrates the fortress while Dororo joins the slaves' ambush, only to be captured. To test his son's loyalty, Kagemitsu orders Hyakkimaru to execute Dororo. Pretending to comply, Hyakkimaru instead hurls his sword into the darkness, striking the physical manifestation of the demons. Though some escape, the slaves surge forth, overwhelming Kagemitsu's forces. Weakened by the demons' deaths, Kagemitsu flees with Nui.

After regaining his eyes, Hyakkimaru realizes Dororo is female, though the child adamantly identifies as male, having been raised as a boy to endure hardship. Encouraging Dororo to embrace strength as a farmer's child, Hyakkimaru gifts the coveted sword before departing alone to continue his quest, promising to reunite once his body is whole. Decades later, the last of the 48 demons is finally slain.

== Characters ==
Characters and voice actors appearing in the anime and video game.

Hyakkimaru (百鬼丸)
Voiced by: Nachi Nozawa (1969), Hiroki Suzuki (2019) (Japanese); Adam Gibbs (2019) (English)
Voiced by: Tomokazu Sugita (Japanese); Chris Murphy (English) (video game)
Hyakkimaru is a teenage rōnin during the Sengoku period and the eldest son of Lord Kagemitsu Daigo and Lady Nui no Kata. Due to a pact forged by his father with 48 demons, the unnamed baby was born malformed, limbless and without facial features or internal organs. The infant was set adrift in the river and was subsequently found and raised by Dr. Jukai who gave the mute child prostheses including special blades grafted into his hard-clay arms forged out of vengeance to kill supernatural entities and regain his true human body. The boy became nearly invincible as a result of the prostheses and nearly heightened senses as he regains each part of his body. During his travels, he earned the name "Hyakkimaru" among other names for his inhuman nature, such as "Dororo" whom he had given to the orphan boy he befriends and journeys with to fulfill his quest in rightfully becoming whole.

Dororo (どろろ)
Voiced by: Minori Matsushima (1969), Rio Suzuki (2019) (Japanese); Chaney Moore (2019) (English)
Voiced by: Ikue Ōtani (Japanese); Bret Walter (English) (video game)
Dororo is an orphaned thief who joins Hyakkimaru in his travels and adventures. For the better part of the series the viewer is led to assume Dororo is a boy. In the original manga and 1969 anime adaptation, Hyakkimaru learns that Dororo is a girl; with the latter freaking-out if Hyakkimaru knows. In the 2019 anime it is revealed early on, though Hyakkimaru makes no note of it. Raised by his parents as a boy, Dororo adopted the masculine speech pattern (rude and abrasive) and ambling stances of the bandits around him. In the original manga and 1969 anime Dororo's father, Hibukuro, was wounded by a samurai official (Itachi in the 2019 anime) and later died. Dororo's mother, Ojiya, froze to death (starvation in the 2019 anime) while fleeing in the snow, but before she died she tattooed a map on Dororo's back to locate money hidden by Hibukuro at Bone Cape. This tattoo only appears when his back is warmed, which he learns of while in a bath. In the epilogue of the 2019 anime, an adult Dororo reunites with a fully human Hyakkimaru.
Kagemitsu Daigo (醍醐景光, Daigo Kagemitsu)
Voiced by: Gorō Naya (1969), Naoya Uchida (2019) (Japanese); David Wald (2019) (English)
Voiced by: Akio Ōtsuka (Japanese); Kevin Blackton (English) (video game)
Hyakkimaru's father and Samurai in the Muromachi period, Lord of Ishikawa and vassal to the governor of Kaga Province. Out of a lust for power, he forged a pact with 48 demons where each could obtain a piece of his newborn child's body. The 2019 anime tweaks his motives, where he made a pact with the 12 demons for the prosperity of his land out of desperation as it suffered from famines, epidemics, droughts and disasters, even if he retains his ambitious and cold characteristics.

Tahōmaru (多宝丸, Daigo Tahōmaru)
Voiced by: Shūsei Nakamura (1969), Shōya Chiba (2019) (Japanese); Blake Jackson (2019) (English)
Voiced by: Takeshi Kusao (Japanese); Kevin Miller (English) (video game)
Younger brother of Hyakkimaru and the second son of Kagemitsu Daigo. Born after Hyakkimaru was abandoned. He dies in the same chapter he is introduced in the manga, but the 2019 anime expands his role and presents him as a young man who cares about his father's land. At first, he hates the sins committed to his older brother, but quickly finds out that the prosperity is reliant upon Hyakkimaru's suffering. In their first duel, Hyakkimaru escapes by slicing Tahomaru's right eye in a riposte; it is doubtful Hyakkimaru did this on purpose, as he was greatly outnumbered and trying to find cover. After this battle, Tahomaru grows increasingly unstable and trains relentlessly to accommodate his missing eye and changed depth perception.

Jukai (寿海)
Voiced by: Kinto Tamura (1969), Akio Ōtsuka (2019) (Japanese); Ty Mahany (2019) (English)
Voiced by: Kiyoshi Kobayashi (Japanese); Adam Harrington (English) (video game)
A skilled doctor and surgeon who used healing magic and alchemical methods to create prostheses for the child who became Hyakkimaru. The 1969 anime renames him Jukō (寿光).

Biwa Hōshi (琵琶法師)
Voiced by: Junpei Takiguchi (1969), Mutsumi Sasaki (2019) (Japanese); James Belcher (2019) (English)
An unnamed blind travelling monk and a biwa hōshi (lute priest). He is an excellent swordsman who carries a sword inside his biwa. He is named Biwamaru and the narrator in the 2019 anime.

Mio (未央)
Voiced by: Reiko Mutō (1969), Nana Mizuki (2019) (Japanese); Luci Christian (2019) (English)
Voiced by: Yuki Makishima (Japanese); Evelyn Huynh (English) (video game)
Hyakkimaru's first love, a beautiful young woman who took care of orphaned children by begging food from soldiers. In the manga and 1969 anime she died before the action starts and therefore is seen only in flashbacks, but in the 2019 anime she shows up in the present and meets Hyakkimaru shortly after he regains his hearing. She sings a lot and her voice is the only thing he can tolerate until he gets used to all the new noises. She gains food and money by prostituting herself to the two armies. Dororo finds this out by following her one night. She dies protecting the other children from a raid ordered by Kagemitsu. Kagemitsu's scouts find her going in and out of the rival camp and assume she is a spy. Hyakkimaru is unable to defend them because he was a returning from killing a demon.

Itachi (イタチ)
Voiced by: Masaaki Okabe (1969), Setsuji Satō (2019) (Japanese); Greg Cote (2019) (English)
A bandit and 2nd-in-command, who betrayed Dororo's father Hibukuro and sided with the authorities. He later kidnapped Dororo to get the map to find the money hidden by Hibukuro. He was about a day behind Ojiya and Dororo, when she the first died in a red lily field. He found her shallow grave and dug it up, to get to her back tattoo. He was eventually betrayed himself, used as bait by his lord, and accepts what Hibukuro always said: The nobles do not care about them. He and a few other samurai survive and return to a life of brigands, looking for Dororo and the treasure.

Nota (ノタ)
A puppy wearing a hat that travels with Hyakkimaru. Original to the 1969 anime. Makes a cameo appearance in the first episode of the 2019 anime.

== Media ==
=== Manga ===
Dororo was first serialized in Weekly Shōnen Sunday between August 27, 1967, and July 22, 1968, before being cancelled. Parallel to the anime broadcast, the manga was then moved and concluded in Akita Shoten's Bōken Ō magazine from May to October 1969. Akita Shoten published the manga in four tankōbon volumes between August 12, 1971, and May 20, 1972. As part of its Osamu Tezuka Manga Complete Works edition, Kodansha compiled the manga into four volumes published between March 12 and June 12, 1981. Akita Shoten republished the manga in a three-volume deluxe edition between August 23 and October 18, 1990, and a new three-volume bunkobon edition under its Akita Bunko imprint on March 28, 1994. On November 11, 2009, Kodansha published the series in a two-volume edition.

In 2008, Vertical Inc. released an English translation of Dororo in three volumes, published between April 29 and August 26. In 2009, it won the Eisner Award in the "Best U.S. Edition of International Material—Japan" division. In 2012, Vertical republished the manga in a single volume edition on March 20.

On November 2, 2012, a manga crossover one-shot by Go Nagai and Dynamic Pro, Dororo to Enma-kun, was published in Nihonbungeisha's Weekly Manga Goraku, featuring Dororo and Dororon Enma-kun's Emma. In 2013, it was expanded into a full series, published unil February 21, 2014, and collected in two volumes.

From October 5, 2018, to March 5, 2020, a manga reinterpretation of Dororo, illustrated by Atsushi Kaneko, set in a futuristic, apocalyptic world with the main characters gender-swapped, titled Search and Destroy, was published by Micro Magazine's TezuComi. Its chapters were collected in three volumes.

From October 19, 2018, to October 18, 2025, a remake manga illustrated by Satoshi Shiki, titled The Legend of Dororo and Hyakkimaru, was published in Akita Shoten's Champion Red. Its chapters were collected in thirteen volumes.

=== Anime ===
The first anime series, animated by Mushi Production, was broadcast on Fuji TV between April 6 and September 28, 1969, for 26 episodes. It was directed by Gisaburou Sugii, with music by Isao Tomita. Unlike the manga, the anime version has a conclusive ending. In 2008, Anime Sols began a crowd-funding project for official streaming of the show. Funding for the first half of the show reached its goal, and the funding continued for the second half. However, Anime Sols folded, and Discotek Media picked up the project and released it on DVD in 2016, including the show's color pilot in the set.

A 24-episode second anime television series adaptation by MAPPA and Tezuka Productions was announced in March 2018. It was directed by Kazuhiro Furuhashi, with music by Yoshihiro Ike. The series aired for 24 episodes from January 7 to June 24, 2019, on Tokyo MX, BS11, and Jidaigeki Senmon Channel.

=== Novels ===
A novel written by Masaki Tsuji and illustrated by Hideki Kitano was published by Asahi Sonorama in September 1978; it was later reprinted in January 2007. A three-volume series, written by Jinzō Toriumi, were published by Gakken Plus in 2001; Hyakkimaru Tanjō (百鬼丸誕生; "Hyakkimaru's Birth") was released in July; Yōtō Ranbu (妖刀乱舞; "Demon Sword Dance") was released in September; and Hōkai Dai Majō (崩壊大魔城; "The Fall of the Great Demon Castle") was released in November. A two-volume novelization of the live-action film, written by Masaru Nakamura, was released by The Asahi Shimbun on December 7, 2006.

=== Video game ===
Developer Sega made a Dororo-based video game for the PlayStation 2 console in 2004. It was released in the United States and Europe under the title Blood Will Tell.

=== Film ===
A live action film directed by Akihiko Shiota was released in 2007.

== Reception ==
Manga artists Rumiko Takahashi and Kentaro Miura have declared themselves fans of the series and have mentioned it as an influence.

The English release of the manga won Best U.S. Edition of International Material—Asia at the 2009 Eisner Awards.

== See also ==
- List of Osamu Tezuka anime
- List of Osamu Tezuka manga
- Osamu Tezuka's Star System
