= List of autobiographical comics =

Autobiographical comics
- Authors: Harvey Pekar; Robert Crumb; Alison Bechdel; Lucy Knisley; MariNaomi
- Publications: Fun Home; Blankets; Epileptic; Persepolis; March
- Series: American Splendor; Real Stuff; Peepshow; Dirty Plotte; Rocky

Base genre
- Non-fiction comics

An autobiographical comic (also autobio, graphic memoir, or autobiocomic) is an autobiography in the form of comic books or comic strips. The form first became popular in the underground comix movement and has since become more widespread. It is currently most popular in Canadian, American and French comics.

Autobiographical comics are a form of biographical comics (also known as biocomics).

== 1880s ==
- Rafael Bordalo Pinheiro (1846–1905) "made an attempt of an autobiographical comics exercise" in his 1881 graphic reportage book No Lazareto de Lisboa ("The Lazaretto of Lisbon"), by including himself and personal thoughts. Some of Bordalo Pinheiro's panels and strips were also autobiographical, such as self-caricatures of personal anecdotes from his travel in Brazil.

== 1910s ==
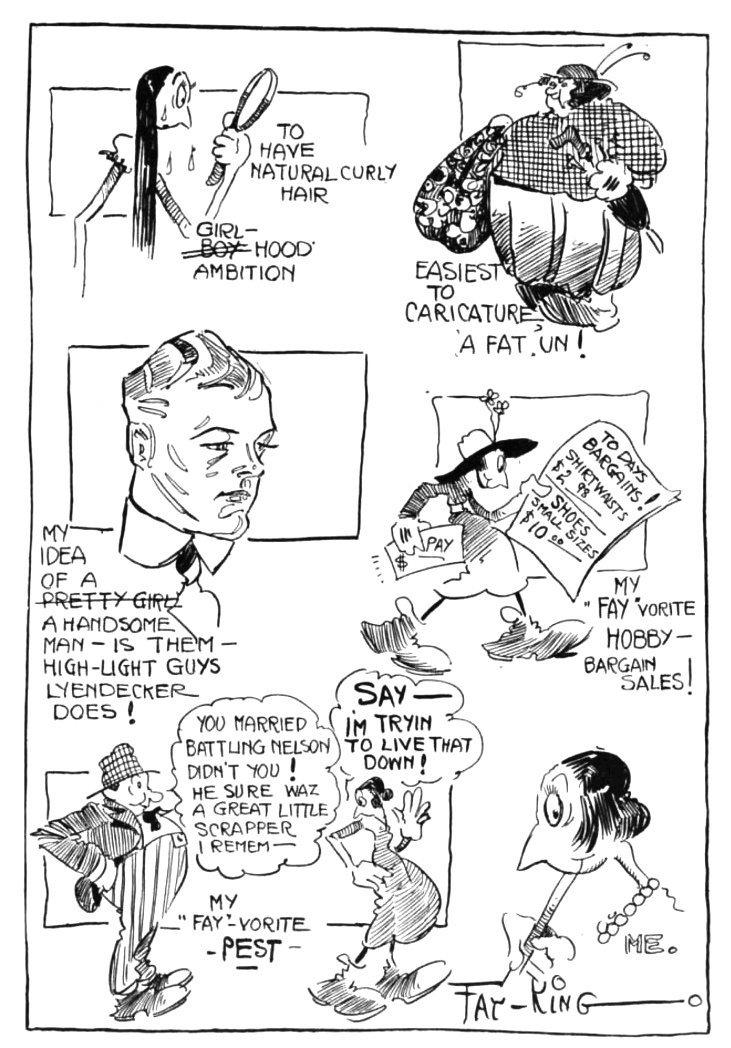
"Cartoonist's Confessional", a 1918 autobio strip by Fay King. Second-to-last cartoon refers to her widely-covered 1916 divorce from boxer Oscar "Battling" Nelson.

- Fay King (1910s–1930s newspaper cartoonist) drew herself as a character later used as Olive Oyl in autobiographical strips portraying her reportages, opinions, and personal life.
- Hinko Smrekar (1883–1942, Slovenian painter, newspaper cartoonist) drew and wrote a 24-page booklet Črnovojnik about his experience in the army and army prisons. This self-ironical proto comic has been published in 1919 – two years after he finished it. All of the pages have up to four illustrations, some include typical comic book balloons. The complete text was handwritten.

== 1920s ==
- Carlos Botelho (1899–1982) had a weekly comic page in a "style that mixed up chronicle, autobiography, journalism, and satire" running from 1928 to 1950 in the Portuguese magazine Sempre Fixe.

== 1930s ==
- Henry (Yoshitaka) Kiyama's The Four Immigrants Manga (drawn 1924–1927, exhibited 1927 in San Francisco, self-published 1931). These 52 two-page strips drew from the experiences of Kiyama and three friends, mostly as Japanese student immigrants to San Francisco between 1904 and 1907, plus material up to 1924.

== 1940s ==
- The artist Taro Yashima (born Atsushi Iwamatsu) published his autobiographical graphic works The New Sun in 1943 and The New Horizon in 1947 (both written in English). The first book describes his early life as well his as his wife Mitsu Yashima's imprisonment and brutalization by the Tokkō (special higher police) in response to their antiwar, anti-Imperialist, and anti-militarist stance in the 1930s. The second book describes their post-prison life in Japan under militarist rule up until the time they emigrated to the United States in 1939.
- Miné Okubo published Citizen 13660, a collection of 198 drawings and accompanying text chronicling the author's experiences in Japanese American internment camps during World War II. Named after the number assigned to her family unit, the book contains almost two hundred of Okubo's pen-and-ink sketches accompanied by explanatory text. Published in 1946, the book has been in print for more than 75 years.

== 1960s ==
=== 1960s in Japan ===
- Shinji Nagashima created Mangaka Zankoku Monogatari ("Cruel Tale of a Cartoonist") in 1961.
- Yoshiharu Tsuge published in 1966 his autobiographical story "Chiko" ("Chiko, the Java sparrow"), depicting his daily life as a struggling manga artist living with a bar hostess making most of their money. Published in the seminal magazine Garo, it started the movement of Watakushi manga ("I manga", or "comics about me"). These short graphic nonfictions (including memoirs, chronicles, travel or dream diaries) were also represented by Yu Takita, Tadao Tsuge, and Shinichi Abe (see below).
- Yu Takita (1932–1990) started in 1968 his Terajima-cho stories ("Terajima neighborhood mystery tales"). They were series of vignettes about 1930s life in this Tokyo district where his parents ran a tavern.
- Tadao Tsuge started in 1968 his personal stories, later collected in Trash Market.

=== USA ===
- In 1969, Justin Green published his first autobiographical comic strip in Gothic Blimp Works #3 titled, "When I Was Sixteen 'Twas a Very Bad Year."

== 1970s ==
- Justin Green, Binky Brown Makes Up His Own Puberty Rites published in Yellow Dog #17, March 1970
- Sam Glanzman started in April 1970 his U.S.S. Stevens autobio stories (1970–1977) about his war service, as 4-pagers in DC Comics's title Our Army at War. Beside memoirs of war actions he witnessed, many are personal vignettes of embarrassing moments, including as an artist. As comics historian John B. Cooke noted, those "autobiographical tales about the sometimes mundane, frequently horrifying experiences aboard a Fletcher-class U.S. navy destroyer during World War II were beginning to appear regularly, debuting two years before Binky Brown."
- Shinichi Abe (born 1950) started in 1971 his autobiographical series Miyoko Asagaya kibun ("The Miyoko Asagaya feeling" or "Miyoko, Asagaya's feeling") for Garo magazine. It chronicled his 1970s bohemian life with his model girlfriend Miyoko in the Asagaya district of Tokyo. (The manga was adapted into the 2009 film Miyoko.)
- Justin Green, though not the first author of autobio comics, is generally acknowledged to have pioneered the confessional genre in English-language comics, because of the immediate influence of his "highly personal autobiographical comics" on other creators (Kominski, Crumb, Spiegelman, Pekar, see below). This was done through the veiled autobio of his alter ego's "Binky Brown" stories, notably the March 1972 comic book Binky Brown Meets the Holy Virgin Mary, an extremely personal work dealing with Green's Catholic and Jewish background and obsessive-compulsive disorder. Binky Brown continued his adventures in "Sacred and Profane" with a story called Sweet Void of Youth.
- In October 1972, Japanese manga artist Keiji Nakazawa created the 48-page story "I Saw It" ("Ore wa Mita"), which told of his firsthand experience of the bombing of Hiroshima. (This was followed by the longer, fictionalized work Barefoot Gen (Hadashi no Gen), later adapted into three films.)
- Aline Kominsky followed Green in November 1972 with her veiled autobio 5-pager "Goldie, a Neurotic Woman" (in Wimmen's Comix #1).
- Art Spiegelman followed Green in 1973 with his 4-page "Prisoner on the Hell Planet" (in Short Order Comix #1), about his feelings after the suicide of his Holocaust-survivor mother (a strip later included in Maus, see below).
- Robert Crumb and Aline Kominsky released in 1974 Dirty Laundry Comics #1, a joint confessional comic book documenting their budding romance, though depicted aboard a fantasy spaceship.
- In 1976, Harvey Pekar began his long-running self-published series American Splendor, which collected short stories written by Pekar, usually about his daily life as a file clerk, and illustrated by a variety of artists. The series led to Pekar meeting his wife Joyce Brabner, who later co-wrote their graphic novel Our Cancer Year (1994) about his battle with lymphoma.
- In 1977, the Italian magazine Alter Alter starts publishing Andrea Pazienza's Le straordinarie avventure di Pentothal (Pentothal's Extraordinary Adventures), in which the author details in a stream of consciousness his own experiences with drugs, arts, politics, counterculture, and the Movement of 1977, through a thinly veiled alter ego.
- In 1978, Eddie Campbell started his autobio strip "In the Days of the Ace Rock 'n' Roll Club" (March 1978 – March 1979). (This led to his Alec stories, see below.)
- In 1979, Malaysian cartoonist Lat published his childhood memoir The Kampung Boy (drawn 1977–1978).
- In the late 1970s, Jim Valentino began his career with some autobio minicomics, released in the early 1980s. In 1985, he published his autobio series Valentino (later collected in Vignettes). In 1997, he created the semi-autobio series A Touch of Silver about a boy coming of age in the 1960s. In 2007, he revisited autobio with Drawings from Life (also collected in Vignettes).
- Throughout the 1970s, autobiographical writing was prominent in the work of many female underground cartoonists, in anthologies such as Wimmen's Comix, ranging from comical anecdotes to feminist commentary based on the artists' lives.

== 1980s ==
- In 1980, Art Spiegelman combined biography and autobiography in his Pulitzer Prize-winning Maus (serialized 1980–1991), about his father's Holocaust experiences, his own relationship with his father, and the process of interviewing him for the book. This work had a major effect on the reception of comics in general upon the world of mainstream prose literature, awakening many to the potential of comics as a medium for stories other than adventure fantasy.
- In 1982, Eddie Campbell's Alec stories started with the Scottish/Australian artist as a young man drifting through life with his friends, and followed him through marriage, parenthood, and a successful artistic career. (They were later collected in The King Canute Crowd, Three Piece Suit, and other books.)
- Campbell's English colleague Glenn Dakin created the Abraham Rat stories (collected in Abe: Wrong for All the Right Reasons), which began as fantasy and became more contemplative and autobiographical.
- Spain Rodriguez drew a number of stories, collected in My True Story, about being a motorcycle gang member in the 1950s.
- In the mid 1980s, Carol Tyler shifted from making paintings to autobiographical comics. Her first published comics piece appeared in Weirdo in 1986.
- Underground legend Robert Crumb focused increasingly on autobiography in his 1980s stories in Weirdo magazine. Many other autobiographical shorts would appear in Weirdo by other artists, including his wife, Aline Kominsky-Crumb, Carol Tyler, Phoebe Gloeckner (see below in 1990s section), and Dori Seda.
- In 1987, Sam Glanzman released his WWII graphic memoir A Sailor's Story (Marvel Comics), a more personal extension of his 1970s U.S.S. Stevens war stories.
- In 1988, Andrea Pazienza releases Pompeo, his last graphic novel, depicting the gradual downfall of a heroin addict (a largely autobiographical character), up to his eventual suicide.
- Jim Woodring's unusual "autojournal" Jim combined dream art with occasional episodes of realistic autobiography.
- David Collier, a Canadian ex-soldier, published autobiographical and historical comics in Weirdo and later in his series Collier's.
- In 1987, DC Comics' anthology Wasteland (1987–1989) featured, unusually for a mainstream title, as well as more conventional forms of black comedy and horror, semi-autobiographical stories based on the life of co-writer Del Close. One of the stories also parodied the autobiographical stories of Harvey Pekar, portraying a version of Pekar's famous appearance on Late Night with David Letterman, in which Pekar's vehement critique of General Electric had earned him a longtime ban from the program.
- In 1989, John Porcellino started in his long-running autobio series King-Cat Comics (still ongoing).

== 1990s ==
Autobiographical work took the English-speaking alternative comics scene by storm during this period, becoming a "signature genre" in much the way that superhero stories dominated American mainstream comic books. (The stereotypical example of an alternative autobiographical comic recounted the awkward moment which followed when, the cartoonist sitting alone in a coffee shop, their ex-girlfriend walks in.) Slice of life comics and comics strips gained popularity during this period as well. However, many artists pursued broader themes.

- Maltese-American Joe Sacco appeared as a character in his journalistic comics, beginning with Yahoo (collected in Notes from a Defeatist) and Palestine.
- In the anthology series Real Stuff, Dennis Eichhorn followed Pekar's example of writing true stories for others to illustrate, but unlike Pekar, emphasized unlikely tales of sex and violence. Many of the Real Stuff stories took place in Eichhorn's native state of Idaho. In 1993, Eichhorn received an Eisner Award nomination for Best Writer and his Real Stuff series received nominations for both Best Continuing Series and Best Anthology. In 1994, Real Stuff again received an Eisner Award nomination for Best Anthology.
- One of the most popular self-published mini-comics of the 1990s in America, Silly Daddy, depicted Joe Chiappetta's parenthood and divorce, sometimes realistically and sometimes in a parallel fantasy story. The story continued in trade paperbacks and as a webcomic.
- The Job Thing, 1993. Carol Tyler details her troubles with low paying jobs. A collection of stories originally published in Street Music Magazine.
- Julie Doucet's series Dirty Plotte (1991–1998), from Canada, began as a mix of outlandish fantasy and dream comics, but moved toward autobiography in what was later collected as My New York Diary.
- A trio of Canadian friends, Seth (Palookaville), Chester Brown (Yummy Fur, The Playboy, I Never Liked You), and Joe Matt (Peepshow), gained rapid renown in North America for their different approaches to autobiography. Brown and Matt were also notorious for depicting embarrassing personal moments such as masturbation and nose picking. Seth created some controversy by presenting realistic fictional stories as if they had actually happened, not as a ploy to fool writers but as a literary technique. However some readers did get fooled.
- Keith Knight's weekly comic strip The K Chronicles began in the early 1990s, exploring themes relevant to Knight's racial heritage, as well as current events, both personal to Knight and general to the world.
- Howard Cruse's graphic novel Stuck Rubber Baby (1995) told a fictionalized version of Cruse's young adulthood as a gay man in the South during civil rights conflicts.
- Phoebe Gloeckner created a series of semi-autobiographical stories drawing on her adolescent experiences with sex and drugs in San Francisco, collected in A Child's Life and Other Stories. She later revisited similar material in her 2004 illustrated novel The Diary of a Teenage Girl: An Account in Words and Pictures.
- Seven Miles a Second, written by painter David Wojnarowicz and illustrated by James Romberger and Marguerite Van Cook, was based on Wojnarowicz's life and his response to the AIDS epidemic.
- The graphic novel David Chelsea in Love described the eponymous author's romantic difficulties in New York City and Portland.
- Rick Veitch told the story of his twenties entirely through a dream diary in the Crypto Zoo volume of Rare Bit Fiends.
- Ariel Schrag's tetralogy Awkward, Definition, Potential, and Likewise, about discovering her sexual identity in high school, was unusual in having been mostly completed while in high school.
- Jim Valentino's A Touch of Silver (Image Comics, 1997) portrayed his unhappy youth in the 1960s.
- English artist Raymond Briggs, best known for his children's books, told the story of his parents' marriage in Ethel & Ernest (1998).
- James Kochalka started to turn his daily life into a daily four-panel strip starting in 1998, collected in Sketchbook Diaries, and later in the webcomic American Elf.
- Swedish cartoonist Martin Kellerman launched the autobiographical comic strip Rocky in 1998, focusing on an anthropomorphic dog and his friends in their everyday life in Stockholm. Rocky is based on Kellerman's own life. The comic has since been translated into Norwegian, Danish, Finnish, Serbian, English, Spanish, and French, either as a running strip or collected in book form.
- Bread and Wine: An Erotic Tale of New York (1999), written by Samuel R. Delany and illustrated by Mia Wolff, is an autobiographical graphic novel about a gay science-fiction writer (Delany) meeting a homeless man who becomes his partner.
- Brian Michael Bendis' three-issue American comic book limited series Fortune and Glory (Oni Press, 1999–2000) is the story of the author's attempts to break into Hollywood by writing screenplays for his hardboiled comics (such as Jinx, A.K.A. Goldfish, and Torso). The series was nominated for Eisner Awards in three categories.

=== 1990s in France ===
This period also saw a rapid expansion of the French small-press comics scene, including a new emphasis on autobiographical work:

- Fabrice Neaud's acclaimed Journal was the first lengthy autobiographical series in French comics.
- David B., another artist who had first published fantasy comics stories, produced the graphic novel L'ascension du haut mal (published in English as Epileptic) applied B.'s distinctive non-realistic style to the story of his equally unusual upbringing, in which his family moved to a macrobiotic commune and sought many other cure's for B.'s brother's grand mal seizures.
- Lewis Trondheim portrayed himself and his friends, albeit with animal heads, in Approximative continuum comics, some of which was later published in English as The Nimrod.
- Much of Edmond Baudoin's later work is based on his personal and family history.
- Dupuy and Berberain's "Journal d'un album" and Jean-Christophe Menu's "Livre de Phamille" also had a significant influence on the French autobiographic graphic novel scene.

== 2000s ==
- Iranian exile Marjane Satrapi created the multi-volume Persepolis, originally published as a newspaper serial in France, about her childhood during the Iranian Revolution.
- Canadian animator Guy Delisle published several travelogues such as Shenzhen: A Travelogue from China (2000), Pyongyang: A Journey in North Korea (2004), Burma Chronicles (2007), and Jerusalem (2011).
- The Spiral Cage, by English artist Al Davison, is about Davison's experience of living with spina bifida.
- Jeffrey Brown's Clumsy (2001) and Unlikely (2003) told the story of two failed relationships using hundreds of single-page stories.
- Blue Pills (original title: Pilules Bleues) is a 2001 Swiss-French autobiographical comic written and illustrated by Frederik Peeters. The comic tells the story of a man falling in love with an HIV-positive woman.
- Lynda Barry's One! Hundred! Demons! (2002) features Barry wrestling with the "demons" of regret, abusive relationships, self-consciousness, the prohibition against feeling hate, and her response to the results of the 2000 United States presidential election.
- Craig Thompson releases Blankets (2003), an award-winning graphic memoir of first love, religious identity, and coming of age.
- Marzena Sowa wrote Marzi, a series of comics about her childhood in 1980s-era Poland.
- Art Spiegelman wrote In the Shadow of No Towers (2004), an oversize graphic memoir about his experiences during the 9/11 attacks.
- Josh Neufeld published his Xeric Award-winning A Few Perfect Hours (2004), documenting his and his girlfriend's backpacking adventures through Southeast Asia, Central Europe, and Turkey.
- Joe Kubert published Yossel April 14, 1943 (2005), a "fake autobiographical graphic novel" about what would have happened if his parents hadn't moved from Poland to the U.S. and they would have been there during the Holocaust.
- Carol Tyler published Late Bloomer, which features all the collected works from Weirdo and other publications.
- Italian comic book artist Gipi releases several graphic novels inspired by his own life experiences: Appunti per una storia di guerra ("Notes for a War Story," 2005), S. (2006, about his father), La mia vita disegnata male ("My Life Badly Drawn," 2008).
- Xeric Award-winner Steve Peters wrote and illustrated Chemistry (2005) about a failed relationship. He drew one panel a day for a year; the entire comic is 32 pages long with a total of 365 panels. Each panel's date is hidden somewhere inside it. Chemistry won the 2006 Howard Eugene Day Memorial Prize.
- Mom's Cancer is an autobiographical webcomic by Brian Fies which describes his mother's fight against metastatic lung cancer, as well as his family's reactions to it. Mom's Cancer was the first webcomic to win an Eisner Award, winning in 2005. Its print collection, published in 2006, won a Harvey Award and a Deutscher Jugendliteraturpreis.
- Alison Bechdel wrote and illustrated Fun Home (2006), about her relationship with her father, and it was named by Time magazine as number one of its "10 Best Books of the Year."
- Martin Lemelman wrote Mendel's Daughter (2006), based on his mother's recorded confessions of her life during the Holocaust. He inserts a lot of family pictures as well.
- Miriam Katin wrote We Are on Our Own: A Memoir (2006), a graphic memoir about her survival, with her mother, of the Holocaust.
- Danny Gregory wrote Everyday Matters, after he taught himself to draw following a traumatic moment in his life: his wife was hit by a train and became paralyzed.
- Anders Nilsen won an Ignatz Award for his graphic memoir, Don't Go Where I Can't Follow (2007)
- In April 2007, Ype Driessen, a Dutch comic artist, published the first autobiographical photo comic called Ype+Willem. With photos he showed everyday happenings in his life with his former boyfriend Willem. He still publishes his comic at FotoStrips.nl (NL).
- Aline Kominsky-Crumb published Need More Love: A Graphic Memoir (2007), her life story, with inserted photographs.
- A Drifting Life (2008) is a thinly veiled autobiographical Japanese manga written and illustrated by Yoshihiro Tatsumi that chronicles his life from 1945 to 1960, the early stages of his career as a cartoonist. The book earned Tatsumi the Tezuka Osamu Cultural Prize, and won two Eisner Awards.
- Carol Lay wrote and illustrated The Big Skinny (2008) about her experiences with weight loss.
- American Widow (2008), written by Alissa Torres and drawn by Sungyoon Choi, is a graphic memoir about Torres's experience as a widow of the September 11 attacks in 2001.
- Stitches: A Memoir is a 2009 graphic memoir written and illustrated by David Small. It tells the story of Small's journey from sickly child to cancer patient, to the troubled teen who made a risky decision to run away from home at sixteen — with nothing more than the dream of becoming an artist. Stitches was a #1 New York Times Best Seller, and was named one of the ten best books of 2009 by Publishers Weekly and Amazon.com. It was also a finalist for the 2009 National Book Award for Young People's Literature. Stitches was a 2010 Alex Awards recipient. Stitches has been translated into seven different languages and published in nine different countries.
- 2009 through 2012, the You'll Never Know trilogy (later to be known as Soldier's Heart) was published. The 11-time Eisner-nominated series is about the lifetime damage her father's PTSD from World War II had on the artist/author, Carol Tyler, and her family.

== 2010s ==
The "graphic memoir" really came into its own this decade, with many of the books by female authors. Lucy Knisley and MariNaomi each published a number of full-length autobiographical comics in the 2010s. The market expanded into middle grade as well, witnessed by such well-received examples as Raina Telgemeier's books, the March series, and Cece Bell's El Deafo.

- 2010:
  - Smile, by Raina Telgemeier, gives an account of the author's life from sixth grade to high school. The book won the 2010 Boston Globe-Horn Book Award for Nonfiction. In 2011, the book won the Eisner Award for Best Publication for Teens. It was also one of Young Adult Library Services Association's 2011 Top Ten Great Graphic Novels for Teens, and a 2011 Association for Library Service to Children Notable Children's Book for Middle Readers. In 2013, it won the Intermediate Young Reader's Choice Award from Washington and the 2013 Rebecca Caudill Young Reader's Book Award from Illinois. It won the 2014 Nevada Young Reader Award. Smile was followed by Sisters (2014), which won Telgemeier an Eisner Award for best Writer/Artist, 2015.
  - Drinking at the Movies, by Julia Wertz. Against the backdrop of her move from San Francisco to New York, the book details serious issues, such as a family member's battle with substance abuse and her own alcoholism, with trademark wit and self-effacement. Drinking at the Movies was nominated for a 2011 Eisner Award in the Best Humor Publication category.
  - Sarah Glidden wrote and illustrated How to Understand Israel in 60 Days or Less, a full-length exploration of Glidden's 2007 visit to Israel as part of a Birthright Israel tour. The book has subsequently been translated into five languages.
  - Vanessa Davis' Make Me a Woman featured stories taken from her diary and are candidly personal, witty and self-deprecating; centering on her youth, mother, relationships with men, and Jewish identity.
  - Fist, Stick, Knife, Gun: A Personal History of Violence is a graphic memoir by Geoffrey Canada, adapted and illustrated by Jamar Nicholas.
  - Joyce Farmer's Special Exits documents in comics form the sad and sometimes humorous episodes of her parents' final years. Special Exits won the National Cartoonists Society's Graphic Novel Award in 2011.
  - Forget Sorrow: An Ancestral Tale is an autobiographical comic book by Belle Yang. It is a memoir about her relatives' experiences in China in the mid-20th century.
- 2011:
  - Nicola Streeten's graphic memoir Billy, Me & You is the first long-form graphic memoir by a British woman to have been published. Dealing with the intersection of comics and medicine, it is cited as an example of graphic medicine.
  - MariNaomi's Kiss and Tell was published in 2011, followed by Dragon's Breath and Other True Stories in 2014, and I Thought YOU Hated ME in 2016.
  - Chester Brown's Paying for It, a combination of memoir and polemic, explores Brown's decision to give up on romantic love and to take up the life of a "john" by frequenting prostitutes. The book, published by Drawn & Quarterly, was controversial, and a bestseller.
  - GB Tran's Vietnamerica depicts the struggles encountered by Tran's grandparents in French Indochina and his parents during the Vietnam War and in their immigration to the United States. Vietnamerica won a Society of Illustrators Gold Medal and was included in Time's list of Top 10 Graphic Memoirs.
  - Adrian Tomine's Scenes From an Impending Marriage, a light-hearted recap of Tomine's wedding and the lead-up to it.
- 2012:
  - Alison Bechdel published Are You My Mother?, a graphic memoir that examines Bechdel's relationship with her mother through the lens of psychoanalysis.
  - My Friend Dahmer, by John "Derf" Backderf, is about his teenage friendship with Jeffrey Dahmer, who later became a serial killer. The book was nominated for an Ignatz Award for Outstanding Graphic Novel. It also was nominated for a Harvey Award and a Reuben Award and received the Revelation Award at the 2014 Angoulême International Comics Festival.
  - Ellen Forney's Marbles: Mania, Depression, Michelangelo, and Me addressed her experiences with bipolar disorder. It was a New York Times Bestseller. Marbles featured prominently in a graphic medicine exhibit that Forney curated for the United States National Library of Medicine.
  - The Voyeurs is a real-time memoir of a turbulent five years in the life of renowned cartoonist, diarist, and filmmaker Gabrielle Bell. It collects episodes from her award-winning series, Lucky, in which she travels to Tokyo, Paris, and the South of France and all over the United States, but remains anchored by her beloved Brooklyn, where sidekick Tony provides ongoing insight, offbeat humor and enduring friendship.
  - Zeina Abirached's graphic memoir, A Game for Swallows: To Die, To Leave, To Return was published by the Graphic Universe division of Lerner Publishing Group. A second memoir, I Remember Beirut, was published in 2014.
  - Little White Duck: A Childhood in China, written by Na Liu and illustrated by her husband, Andrés Vera Martínez, discusses Na Liu's childhood in China during the 1970s and 1980s.
  - A Chinese Life is a French graphic novel co-written by Li Kunwu and Philippe Ôtié and illustrated by Li Kunwu. The book describes Li Kunwu's life during the Cultural Revolution.
  - Darkroom: A Memoir in Black and White is an autobiographical comic set during the civil rights movement written by American author Lila Quintero Weaver. The author was nominated for the 2012 Ignatz Award for Promising New Talent for this work.
- 2013:
  - Congressman and civil rights leader John Lewis released March: Book One, the first volume of an autobiographical graphic novel trilogy, co-written by Andrew Aydin and drawn by Nate Powell. March: Book Two was published in 2015 and March: Book Three appeared in 2016.
  - Ulli Lust's Today is the Last Day of the Rest of Your Life (2013; originally published in German in 2009) won an Ignatz Award for best graphic novel, the LA Times Book Award for Graphic Novels and then was nominated for an Eisner Award for Best Reality-Based Work.
  - Nicole Georges' graphic memoir, Calling Dr. Laura. The book depicts the events following the author's visit to a palm reader at age twenty-three, where she is told by the psychic there that her father is not actually dead like her family claimed years ago. In light of this news, the author is "sent into a tailspin about her identity," and endeavors to find out the truth, recounting the occurrences of her childhood and grappling with feelings of uncertainty.
- 2014:
  - Can't We Talk About Something More Pleasant? by cartoonist Roz Chast. The book is about Chast's parents in their final years. In 2014, the book won the National Book Critics Circle Award in the Autobiography/Memoir section. The book also won the inaugural Kirkus Prize in non-fiction category presented by Kirkus Reviews. The book was a finalist for the Thurber Prize for American Humor. The book was selected as one of The New York Times Book Review's 10 Best Books of 2014.
  - El Deafo, written and illustrated by Cece Bell, is a loose autobiographical account of Bell's childhood and life with her deafness. The characters in the book are all anthropomorphic bunnies.
  - Mimi Pond's Over Easy (2014), a coming-of-age story about a young Margaret Pond as she works at Imperial Café, a diner full of hippies and punks in the late 1970s. It is in this diner that Margaret makes the transition into 'Madge' and gets a glimpse at adulthood, which includes addiction, confusion, awkward moments, the artist dream, and sexual awakenings. Over Easy encapsulates 1970s Oakland in a witty, slightly fictionalized, memoir of Pond's experiences. The memoir won the PEN Center USA award for Graphic Literature Outstanding Body of Work, with a special mention; Pond also won an Inkpot Award after the release of Over Easy.
  - Tomboy: A Graphic Memoir, by Liz Prince, explores what it means to be female and describes Prince's struggle with gender issues. This memoir is told through short, related stories starting from Prince's early childhood experiences and ending when Prince is a teenager and has slowly learned to define herself as a woman on her own terms. The book received a starred review from Kirkus Reviews.
  - An Iranian Metamorphosis is Mana Neyestani's autobiographical graphic novel about life in post-revolutionary Iran. Originally published in French, it was later published in German, Spanish and English.
  - The Hospital Suite by John Porcellino details his struggles with illness in the 1990s and early 2000s.
  - Lucy Knisley's An Age of License is a travel memoir recounting the author's trip to Europe/Scandinavia, thanks to a book tour. Knisley's Displacement: A Travelogue (2015) was nominated for the 2016 Eisner Award for Best Reality-Based Work.
  - Meags Fitzgerald published Photobooth: A Biography, a non-fiction graphic novel detailing her interest in chemical photo booths; it won the 2015 Doug Wright Spotlight Award. She followed it in 2015 with the autobiographical graphic novel Long Red Hair.
- 2015:
  - The Arab of the Future is French-Syrian cartoonist Riad Sattouf's account of his childhood growing up in France, Libya and Syria in the 1970s, 80s, and 90s. The book was nominated for the 2016 Eisner Award for Best Reality-Based Work. The Arab of the Future 2 appeared in 2016.
  - Dare to Disappoint is Özge Samancı's graphic coming-of-age memoir. Her story takes place after the third military coup leading to Turkey's rapid change to neo-capitalism from 1980 to 2000. The book was translated into five languages.
  - Becoming Unbecoming, by English author Una, depicts the effects of misogyny and sexism on twelve-year old Una growing up in northern England in 1977 while the Yorkshire Ripper is on the loose, creating a panic among townspeople.
  - Honor Girl is a graphic memoir written and illustrated by Maggie Thrash. It is the story of Thrash's first crush at an all-girls summer camp in Kentucky in 2000.
  - Bill Griffith's memoir, Invisible Ink: My Mother’s Secret Love Affair With a Famous Cartoonist. (For over a decade, starting in 1957, Griffith's mother Barbara had an affair with cartoonist Lawrence Lariar; this formed the basis of Invisible Ink.)
- 2016:
  - Tom Hart's Rosalie Lightning, a memoir named after his daughter, who had died suddenly when she was almost two, and about his and his wife's grief and their attempts to make sense of their life afterwards. The book was nominated for the 2017 Eisner Award for Best Reality-Based Work.
  - Rokudenashiko's What is Obscenity? The Story of a Good for Nothing Artist and Her Pussy is a graphic memoir of a Japanese artist who has been jailed twice for so-called acts of obscenity and the distribution of pornographic materials yet continues to champion the depiction of the vagina.
- 2017:
  - Thi Bui's graphic memoir The Best We Could Do chronicles the life of her refugee parents and siblings, their life in Vietnam prior to their escape after the Vietnam War, and their eventual migration to the United States, delving into themes of immigration, war and intergenerational trauma. The book received a number of accolades, including the National Book Critics Circle Award, the American Book Award, and was also a finalist for the Eisner Award for Best Reality-Based Work.
  - Micah R Maher's Basically My Day is an autobiographical anthropomorphic comic about their life as a queer-transgender diabetic artist started in 2017.
- 2018:
  - In Fab4 Mania, Carol Tyler referenced her personal writings from 1965 for a first-hand account of seeing the Beatles in person in Chicago at age 13.
- 2019:
  - Actor and activist George Takei published They Called Us Enemy, an autobiographical graphic novel co-written with Justin Eisinger and Steven Scott and illustrated by Harmony Becker.

== 2020s ==
The autobiographical graphic novel started to bloom to the point, where it is hard to follow the constant production.

- 2020:
  - In October 2020, British Illustrator Rebecca Burgess published the graphic memoir How to Be Ace: A Memoir of Growing Up Asexual, a memoir about her experience growing up asexual. The book is permanently banned from schools in Wentzville, Missouri.
- 2022:
  - On 2 June 2022, English filmmaker and comedian Lewis Hancox published the autobiographical graphic novel Welcome to St. Hell: My Trans Teen Misadventure, a cringe comedy focusing on Hancox's life growing up in St Helens as a transgender youth during the 2000s.
  - On the 13th of September 2022, Canadian artist Kate Beaton published the autobiographical comic Ducks: Two Years in the Oil Sands, her memoir of working in oil fields in Alberta. It would win honours including the Jan Michalski Prize for Literature and placed first in the 2023 Canada Reads book contest.
  - On the 19th of September 2022, Slovenian artist Žiga Valetič published a 149-page autobiographical graphic novel The Highway, which was made with the help of artificial intelligence – the computer program Midjourney. The book has been published online while the Slovenian version has also been printed.
  - In 2025, the graphic autobiographical memoir Feeding Ghosts by Tessa Hulls won the Pullitzer Prize.
