= Susumu Katsumata (manga artist) =

Japanese manga artist

Susumu Katsumata (勝又 進, Katsumata Susumu; December 27, 1943 – December 3, 2007) was a Japanese manga artist.

== Biography ==
Katsumata was born in Kahoku, Miyagi in 1943. His father was married to another woman, so he grew up as an illegitimate child only with his mother. He has never met his father. At an early age his mother died and his older sister took care after him.

He graduated from Tokyo University of Education with a degree in physics. He also studied nuclear physics at its postgraduate school. He debuted in 1966 in the alternative manga magazine Garo. He was mainly active as a four panel comic artist, though he has made a series of short stories too. In 2006 won the 35th Japan Cartoonists Association Award Grand prize of 500,000 yen for Red Snow. This book is a collection of short stories, that all together form a somewhat coherent setting. The main character is a young boy or early teenager without any sexual experiences yet, growing up with older women. Most stories feature promiscuous behavior, adultery, domestic violence, prostitution, rape in a setting of the countryside suffering from the poor economic situations like was the post WWII situation in Japan. The older men in the stories are often repressive towards the female characters, while the main character takes the side of the women.

After the Japanese publication the French publisher Éditions Cornélius started working on a translation, but Katsumata never saw the result. Katsumata died of melanoma in Ōta, Tokyo on December 3, 2007, at the age of 63. He is survived by at least one son, Daichi. Drawn & Quarterly published the book in English in 2009 with an additional interview and short biography included in the book to introduce the author to the English reading audience.

In 2018 a second book was published in English, Fukushima Devil Fish. Again a collection of short stories.

His short stories are stylistic and in topics very similar to that of Tadao Tsuge, Yoshiharu Tsuge and Yoshihiro Tatsumi.

== Bibliography ==
- Red Snow, Drawn & Quarterly, 2009
- Fukushima Devil Fish, Breakdown Press, 2018
