= Yōko Kondō (manga artist) =

Japanese manga artist

Yōko Kondō (Japanese: 近藤 ようこ, Hepburn: Kondō Yōko; born May 11, 1957) is a Japanese manga artist. Beginning her career in 1979 in the alternative manga magazine Garo, she is known for her historical and folklore-inspired works as well as for adaptations of classic Japanese literature.

== Life ==
Kondō was born on May 11, 1957 in Niigata. She started being interested in manga after reading Sanpei Shirato's Kamui Gaiden and started drawing by imitating his style. In highschool, she met Rumiko Takahashi and together they founded a manga club at their school. Kondō supported Takahashi in the beginnings of her trying to start a career as a manga artist. She was also interested in folklore, influenced by the works of Shinobu Orikuchi, which is why she studied folklore at Kokugakuin University in Tokyo after finishing high school.

In her last year at university in 1979 she published her first work as a professional manga artist in the alternative manga magazine Garo, the short story "Monorōgu". She was an active contributor to several gekiga magazines after this and profited from the boom in erotic gekiga publications such as Gekiga Alice. Together with other female artists who worked for erotic magazines for men such as Kyoko Okazaki, Erica Sakurazawa and Shungicu Uchida, she is sometimes referred to as "onna no ko H mangaka" ("women H cartoonists"). She also worked as an assistant for manga artist Murasaki Yamada.

In 1984, when the boom of erotic gekiga was subsiding, she was approached by the editors of Weekly Manga Sunday to publish in the magazine. This led her to publish short stories about the daily life of neighbors in a quarter of Niigata in the magazine from 1984 until 1985. The ensuing short story collection Miharashi ga oka nite was a success and she won the excellence award at the Japan Cartoonists Association Award 1986 for it. She kept publishing manga with similar daily life themes for several years. She was working for magazines in different age- and gender-specific publishing categories of the Japanese manga industry; for shōjo manga magazines like Asuka, seinen manga magazines like Big Comic and josei manga magazines like Feel Young.

After this, she shifted towards adaptations of classic Japanese literature, among them works of Shinobu Orikuchi, Natsume Sōseki and Ango Sakaguchi. Several of these literature adaptations were published in the manga magazine Comic Beam.

== Reception ==
Her early work for Garo received scholarly attention for bringing female perspectives into alternative manga. Together with Murasaki Yamada and Hinako Sugiura, who also worked as an assistant for Yamada, she was referred to as "three Garo girls" (ガロ三人娘 Garo san'nin musume), translated by Ryan Holmberg (translator of Murasaki Yamada's Talk to My Back) as "three daughters of Garo". Holmberg argued that the moniker was "highly misleading", and that while male artists were not usually distinguished by gender, the moniker does so for the female artists. Holmberg argued that, therefore, the moniker displays sexism.

Besides the Excellence Prize at the Japan Cartoonists Association Award that she received in 1986 for Miharashi ga oka nite, she won the Grand Prize at the Japan Media Arts Festival 2014 for her adaptation of Yasumi Tsuhara's fantasy novel Goshiki no Fune. The jury commented: "We cannot help but admire KONDO’s sincerity and creativity when she addressed issues. This masterpiece, praised unanimously by its readers for its beauty in staunchly portraying the cruelty concealed in the world while at the same time providing the humor and courage to live, compels us to give something back." Her manga Sensō to Hitori no Onna, based on a novel by Ango Sakaguchi, was among the jury-selected works of Japan Media Arts Festival 2013.

She has been nominated twice for the Tezuka Osamu Cultural Prize; once in 2005 for a re-edition of her 1980s series Suikyō Kitan and once in 2022 for her series Takaoka Shinnō Kōkaiki.

Several of her manga have been adapted for film or television. Her manga series Roommates was adapted into a live-action TV series in 1996. An adaptation of her Ani Kaeru was released as a TV drama in 2009.

In the late 2010s, some of her works were translated into French, Italian and Spanish.

== Works ==
Title	Year	Notes	Refs
"Monorōgu" (ものろおぐ)	1979	Published in Garo	
Tsukiyomi (月夜見)	1981	Short story collection Published by Bronze-sha in 1 vol.	
Miharashi ga oka nite (見晴らしガ丘にて)	1985	Short stories published in Weekly Manga Sunday; Published by Jitsugyō no Nihonsha in 1 vol.	
Tōku ni Arite (遠くにありて)	1987–1990	Serialized in Big Comic; Published by Shogakukan in 2 vol.	
Horizon Blue	1988–1990	Serialized in Garo; Published by Seirindo in 1 vol.	
Suikyō Kitan (水鏡綺譚)	1988–1990	Serialized in Asuka; Published by Kadokawa Shoten in 2 vol.	
Utsurigi Honki (移り気本気)	1989–1990	Serialized in Big Comic for Lady; Published by Shinchosha in 1 vol.	
Roommates (ルームメイツ)	1991–1996	Serialized in Big Comic; Published by Shogakukan in 4 vol.	
Yōreiboshi (妖霊星)	1992–1993	Serialized in Garo; Published by Seirindo in 1 vol.	
Kokoro no Meikyū (心の迷宮)	1993–1998	Serialized in Big Gold; Published by Shogakukan in 3 vol.	
Acacia no Michi (アカシアの道)	1995	Serialized in Weekly Manga Action; Published by Futabasha in 1 vol.	
Akegata Rouge (あけがたルージュ)	1997–2000	Serialized in Big Comic and Big Comic Zōkan; Published by Shogakukan in 2 vol.	
Tsukikage no Onhaha (月影の御母)	1997–1999	Serialized in Nemuki; Published by Asahi Sonorama in 1 vol.	
Virginia (ヴァージニア)	1999–2000	Serialized in Office You and Office You Plus; Published by Seirinkogeisha in 1 vol.	
Hagane no Musume (鋼の娘)	2001–2002	Serialized in Feel Young; Published by Shodensha in 1 vol.	
Hitori no Yoru mo Bagakunai (独りの夜も長くない)	2001–2003	Serialized in Big Comic Zōkan and Big Comic; Published by Shogakukan in 1 vol.	
Kinu no Himo (絹の紐)	2002–2003	Serialized in Manga Erotics F Published by Ohta Publishing in 1 vol.	
Ani Kaeru (兄帰る)	2005–2006	Serialized in Big Comic; Published by Shogakukan in 1 vol.	
Takara no Yome (宝の嫁)	2006	Published by Bunkasha in 1 vol.	
Yūyake Kōen (ゆうやけ公園)	2009–2011	Serialized in Hontomo; Published by Tokuma Shoten in 1 vol.	
Sensō to Hitori no Onna (戦争と一人の女)	2012	Based on a novel by Ango Sakaguchi; Published by Seirinkogeisha in 1 vol.	
Goshiki no Fune (五色の舟)	2013	Based on a novel by Yasumi Tsuhara; Serialized in Comic Beam; Published by Enterbrain in 1 vol.	
Shisha no Sho (死者の書)	2014–2016	Based on a book by Shinobu Orikuchi; Serialized in Comic Beam; Published by Kadokawa Shoten in 2 vol.	
Yume Jūya (夢十夜)	2016	Based on the short story collection Ten Nights of Dreams by Natsume Sōseki; Published by Iwanami Shoten in 1 vol.	
Takaoka Shinnō Kōkaiki (高丘親王航海記)	2019–2021	Based on a book by Tatsuhiko Shibusawa; Serialized in Comic Beam; Published by Kadokawa Shoten in 4 vol.	
