= Red Snow (disambiguation) =

Red Snow or red snow may refer to:

- Red Snow, a British thermonuclear weapon (1958–1972)
- "Red Snow" (The Twilight Zone), a 1986 television episode which starred George Dzundza and Victoria Tennant
- Red snow, a type of snow algae
- Watermelon snow, reddish snow caused by above type of snow algae
- 30 Days of Night: Red Snow, a prequel to the comic 30 Days of Night
- redsn0w, the jailbreak of the second generation version of the iPod Touch by the popular iPhone Dev Team
- Red Snow, a manga novel by Susumu Katsumata
- Red Snow (1952 film), American film starring Guy Madison and Philip Ahn
- Red Snow (2003 film), Chinese film by Zhang Jianya
- Red Snow (2019 film), Canadian film by Marie Clements
- Red Snow (2021 film), American film starring Vernon Wells
- Red Snow (2026 film), upcoming Finnish film by Ilja Rautsi
