= Trash Market =

Japanese manga series

- The cover of Trash Market, showing an old woman from "Gently Goes the Night" mischievously reporting a rape
- Manga
- Written by: Tadao Tsuge
- English publisher: Drawn & Quarterly
- Magazine: Garo · Yagyō
- Published: May 12, 2015

Trash Market is a volume of semi-autobiographical gekiga short stories by Japanese manga artist Tadao Tsuge. The stories were serialized mainly in the Japanese alternative manga magazine Garo from 1968 to 1972. They were published by Drawn & Quarterly in English on May 12, 2015. Many of the stories are based on Tsuge's life experiences, such as his time at a blood bank, and critics have noted the realism of the stories.

== Plot ==
"Up on the Hilltop, Vincent Van Gogh" (丘の上でヴィンセント・ヴァン・ゴッホは, Oka no Ue de Vinsento Van Gohho wa)
A pharmaceutical manufacturer worker and replica painter tells a biography of Vincent van Gogh. His friend Goro, a student activist, visits him complaining of a bald spot he got from being hit at a protest as well as about American presence in Japan. After coming home from a union meeting he finds the police taking Goro to the station as a witness.
"Song of Showa" (昭和ご詠歌, Shōwa Goeika)
Tomeo, a child, is disliked by his grandfather who feels that his mother pays him more attention than his two working older brothers. Tomeo's father also stays at home and takes out his frustration on his mother and him. One day, as his father hits them and argues with his grandfather, one of his brothers leaves because of the family's issues.
"Manhunt"
Mr. Taguchi, an office worker, had an urge to see steam engines and disappeared for three months. When he had spent all his money traveling from town to town and returned, a local newspaper interviews him for a piece. The newspaper recounts a narrative it put together while searching for him, but he finds that the details contradict his experiences. Confused, he reluctantly agrees to write notes for them based on their story.
"Gently Goes the Night" (夜よゆるやかに, Yoru yo Yuruyaku ni)
A veteran of the Burma Campaign who suffers from daydreams bumps into a young woman and talks to her at a café. As he walks with her along an embankment, he rapes her as a nosy lady watches and the lady yells for help afterwards.
"A Tale of Absolute and Utter Nonsense"
A manga artist joins a large group which discusses plans to get revenge on the government. On the day of the attack, his group violently clashes with the riot police protecting Edo Castle and each side suffers casualties. As the manga artist dies, he sees Emperor Hirohito's back as he tips his hat.
"Trash Market" (屑の市, Kuzu no Ichi)
A group of men wait outside a blood bank exchanging stories while waiting to sell their blood so they can eat for the day. They speak to a woman who needs money and they collect some to watch her have sex with an old man. However, both are reluctant and the man ends up embracing her instead.

== Production ==
Tsuge drew from his own life experiences for many of the stories in the manga, making some of them early autobiographical comics. Tsuge had a dysfunctional family—with his mother, father, and stepfather always fighting—so he would stay out of his house until his two brothers came home from work. After graduating from middle school, he got a job assembling and cleaning equipment at a blood bank where "the physically handicapped, hoodlums, and thugs" waited in the waiting room and in the yard. One time as he was cleaning the bathroom, he read graffiti in pencil saying: "Even I, a former lieutenant in the navy, have been reduced to selling my blood", which weighed on his heart. Another seller that had an impression on him was one who was six feet tall and had the build of a wrestler, but a disfigured face, which resulted in the man wailing after nurses gossiped about him.

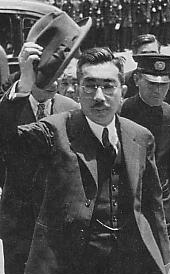
A frontal view of Hirohito tipping his homburg

Tsuge said that there was some self-portraiture of him in the protagonist of "Up on the Hilltop, Vincent Van Gogh", which was originally a prose story that he remade for Garo. Tsuge was also attracted to Ken Domon's photography of beggars and copied similar photographs by hand in "Song of Showa" to impart a sense of realism and poverty. Despite being apolitical, Tsuge was forced to participate in protests against the US-Japan Security Treaty by his union in front of the Diet Building which made him feel "constantly on edge and irritable". Katsuichi Nagai, the founder of Garo, decided to blank the final panel of "A Tale of Absolute and Utter Nonsense"—showing the back of Emperor Hirohito tipping his hat—out of fear of attacks from right-wing groups due to perceived lèse-majesté.

== Release ==
A majority of the stories were originally serialized in the alternative manga magazine Garo by Serindō, with the eponymous story in Yagyō, from 1968 to 1972. The individual stories have been collected in various anthologies by different publishers in Japan. Drawn & Quarterly announced the short story collection at San Diego Comic-Con in July 2014. At their panel, the marketing manager Julia Pohl-Miranda said of Tsuge: "He's had a long career of not only writing about the seedy underbelly of [the] city, but also engaging with the seedy underbelly of [the] city." The manga was translated by Ryan Holmberg and published on May 12, 2015.

== Reception ==
Greg Hunter of The Comics Journal ascribed a visual airiness to the manga which meshes well with the stories, noting a tension between Tsuge's apolitical beliefs and the subject matter, concluding by saying: "it is no exaggeration to say that the book is a triumph—a moving collection of art made in depressed circumstances, and with irony and ambiguity intact." Hillary Brown of Paste felt that the art was primitive and that the manga did not try to get inside the heads of its characters, likening it to Roger Corman's films by saying that it is "driven by social issues and a sense of unease, long on cheap style and energy, full of titillation and with little in the way of gray." James Hadfield of The Japan Times said that the manga "stands on its own merits, vividly capturing the tumult and existential funk of Japan's postwar period as seen through the eyes of society's least fortunate." Publishers Weekly described the manga as dark, "but never maudlin, and thoughtful without falling into pretension", but called its tendency to ramble its biggest flaw, concluding that it is "an honest, uncomfortable look into postwar malaise". Tim O'Neil of The A.V. Club called the manga Tsuge's "most empathetic and engaging work," noting how he humanizes the characters in the eponymous story as well as how his stories imply a larger context, concluding that Tsuge is "committed to a view of comics realism that is both unflattering and unflinching." Sean Rogers of The Globe and Mail described it as "one of the year's major comics publications, historically important and aesthetically raw," adding that Tsuge depicts postwar Japan "with a crudity that hovers between realism and disgust."

== See also ==
- Yoshiharu Tsuge – the brother of the artist
