= Takashi Nemoto =

Japanese comics artist and illustrator (born 1958)

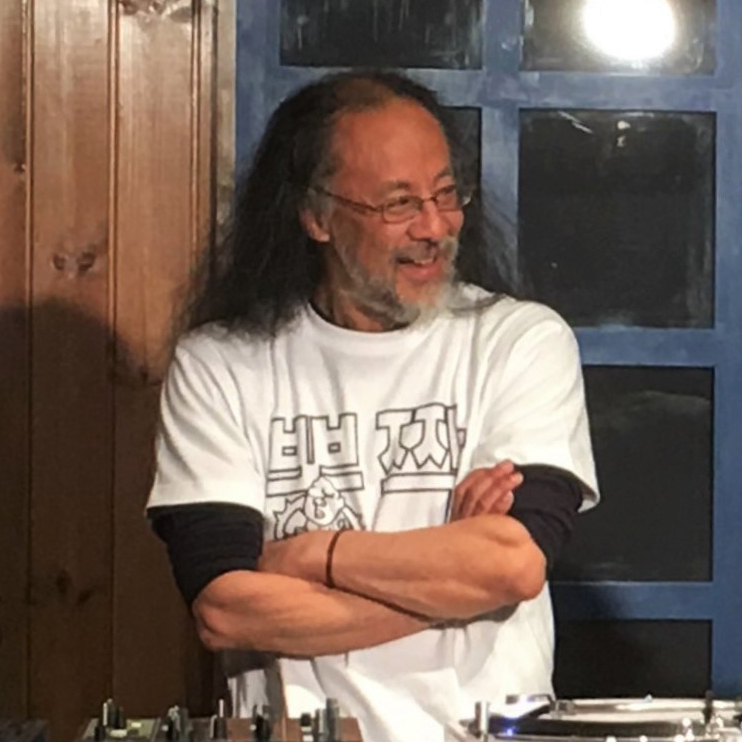
Takashi Nemoto in 2017

Takashi Nemoto (根本敬 Nemoto Takashi^{?}; born 28 June 1958) is a Japanese comics artist and illustrator.

== Biography ==
Nemoto was born in Tokyo, He has been drawing since childhood, with themes and obsessions that will remain consistent until maturity: one of his first manga stories, from the third grade, showed the emperor Hirohito beaten in public baths and eventually forced to pee in his pants. Bored and uninspired by the contemporary popular manga that surrounded him, unaware of underground innovations, Nemoto at the age of thirteen stopped drawing. His random discovery of"Jonetsu no Penguin Gohan" (さよならペンギン) by Teruhiko Yumura, in the late seventies, rekindled his enthusiasm for manga. In 1981 he published his first story in the magazine Garo, which encouraged underground and alternative artists to the mainstream. Create two characters, the selfish Sakigi Yoshida and the passive Toukishi Murata, who embody the two extremes of the human being and, through them, vents trying to be as vulgar as possible. In his work human abjection and degradation have an aggressive and political matrix, an all-out attack launched at the height of the economic bubble, against the values of the Japanese world of work and against the notions of national and racial pride. Since the first works Nemoto becomes one of the most prolific authors of the underground art world, from his works for Garo, to the illustration of covers for music CDs, to contributions with strips and illustrations in Japanese magazines of pop music and pop culture. Together with the cultural critic Manabu Yuasa, he is the co-author of a fundamental study on South Korean street culture.

His most famous and controversial works have been collected in the "Monster Men Bureiko Lullaby" anthology, originally published in Japan in 1990, and translated into English by PictureBox in 2008.

== See also ==
- Heta-uma
- Garo (magazine)
