= The Man Without Talent =

Japanese manga series (1985–1986)

- 1988 collected edition cover

無能の人 (Munō no Hito)
- Genre: I-novel, dark comedy
- Created by: Yoshiharu Tsuge
- Manga
- Written by: Yoshiharu Tsuge
- Published by: Nihon Bungeisha
- English publisher: New York Review Comics
- Magazine: Comic Baku
- Original run: 1985 – 1986
- Volumes: 1
- Live-action film

Nowhere Man
- Directed by: Naoto Takenaka
- Written by: Toshiharu Maruichi
- Music by: Gontiti
- Released: 1991
- Runtime: 107 minutes

The Man Without Talent (Japanese: 無能の人, Hepburn: Munō no Hito; alternately titled in English as Nowhere Man) is a Japanese manga series written and illustrated by Yoshiharu Tsuge, originally serialized in the manga magazine Comic Baku from 1985 to 1986. The series is an I-novel (a genre of semi-autobiographical confessional literature) focused on the exploits of an impoverished former manga artist who attempts to support his family through a variety of odd jobs and failed schemes. The Man Without Talent was the final major work published by Tsuge prior to his retirement from manga in 1987.

While The Man Without Talent did not enjoy particular commercial success during its original serialization, the release of a live action film adaptation of the series in 1991 led to renewed critical recognition for both The Man Without Talent and for works by Tsuge generally. The collected edition of The Man Without Talent would go on to become a bestseller, and became Tsuge's most popular work. An English-language translation of the manga by Ryan Holmberg was published by New York Review Comics in 2020, making it the first book by Tsuge to be released in English.

== Synopsis ==
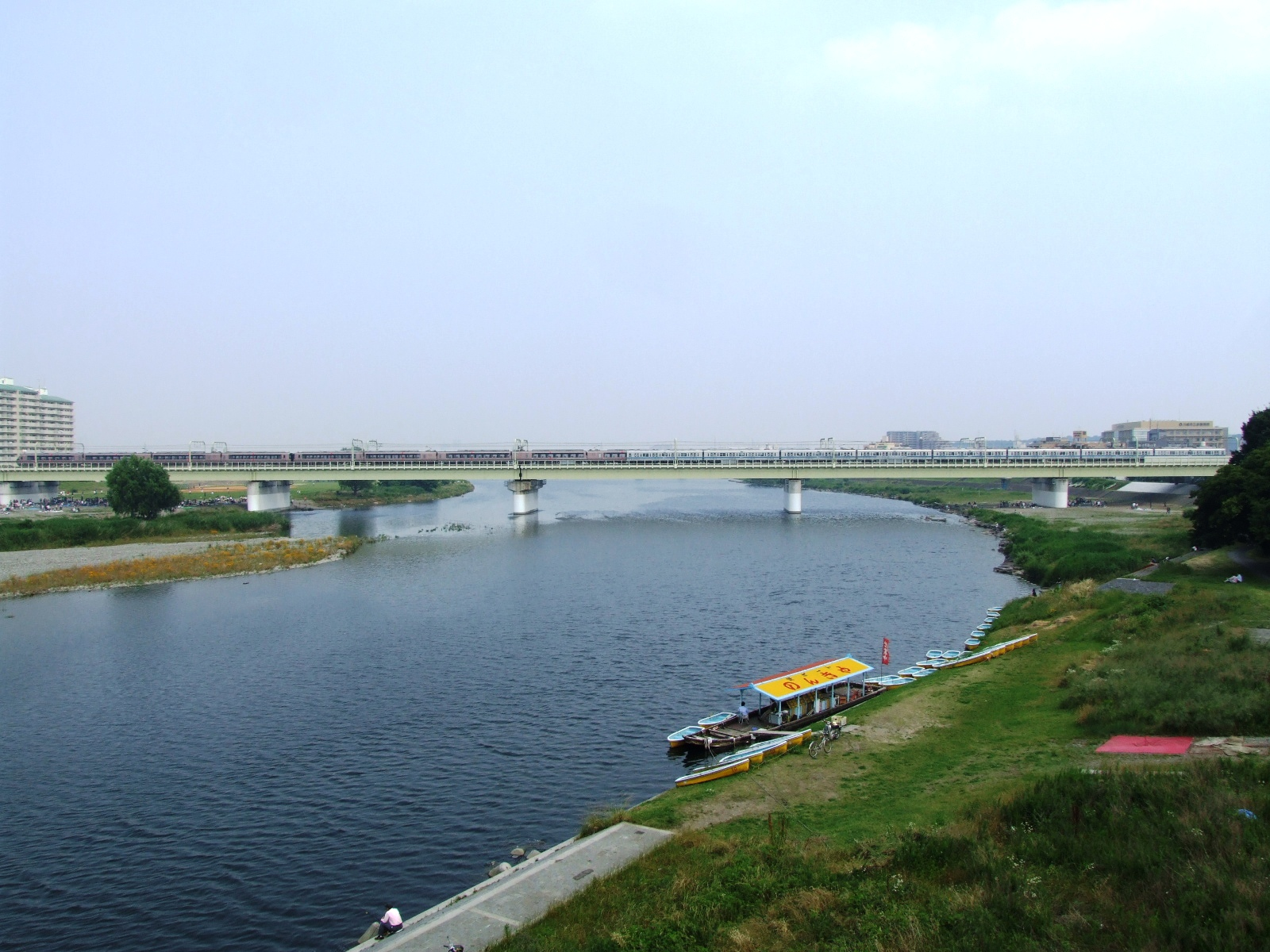
Tama River

The Man Without Talent is set in Chōfu, located in western Tokyo, where former manga artist Sukezo Sukegawa lives in poverty with his wife and young son. His pride and obstinance prevent him from actively seeking new work as an artist, so he earns a meager income through a variety of odd jobs and schemes, such as selling stones along the banks of the Tama River and restoring antique cameras.

== Production and release ==
The Man Without Talent is an I-novel, a genre of semi-autobiographical confessional literature that has been popular in Japan since the early twentieth century. Stories in the genre typically focus on the author surrogate main character as they struggle with poverty, work, or romance. Tsuge was a major figure in importing the I-novel into manga, beginning with his manga series The Swamp published in the experimental manga magazine Garo in 1966. The plot of The Man Without Talent draws from Tsuge's own hiatus from manga taken from 1981 to 1984, though translator Ryan Holmberg notes that Tsuge's I-novels incorporate elements of fiction and magical realism and are "rarely, and arguably never, straight transcriptions of his personal life."

The Man Without Talent was serialized in the manga magazine Comic Baku from 1985 to 1986. (Note: Comic Baku was established in 1984 specifically as a publication for Tsuge's manga. Founded as an attempt to revive Garo, it folded shortly after Tsuge's retirement, publishing only fifteen issues.) The first chapter of the series, Selling Stones, was published in the Spring 1985 issue. It was the final major work published by Tsuge prior to his retirement in 1987.

The series was first printed as a standalone edition in 1987 as a magazine, and as a hardcover edition in 1988; it has since been regularly re-printed. An English-language translation of The Man Without Talent was published by New York Review Comics on January 28, 2020, making it the first book by Tsuge to be released in English. (Note: An English translation of Tsugue's one-shot manga Screw Style was published in The Comics Journal in 2003.)

== Adaptations and other media ==
A live-action film adaptation of The Man Without Talent, released in English under the title Nowhere Man, premiered in 1991. The film was directed by and starred Naoto Takenaka in his directorial debut, and co-starred Jun Fubuki and Kotaro Santo with a screenplay by Toshiharu Maruichi and music by Gontiti. In November 1991, Garo published a special issue on The Man Without Talent to coincide with the release of the film adaptation. Contributions to the issue were published as a book titled Advice from The Man Without Talent that same year.

A live-action television adaptation of The Man Without Talent was produced as part of Yoshiharu Tsuge World, a twelve-episode anthology series adapting works by Tsuge that aired on TV Tokyo in 1998.

== Reception ==
=== Critical reception ===
The Man Without Talent has been widely acclaimed by critics, with its English translation listed by The Guardian as one of the best graphic novels of 2019, and receiving starred reviews from both Publishers Weekly and Kirkus Reviews. Particular praise was offered for the series' art, with Eric Margolis of The Japan Times praising Tsugue's "cinematic angles and composed frames", and Brian Nicholson of The Comics Journal praising the detailed background and "truly pitiable character design" for Sukezo. Its treatment of poverty and the working class was similarly praised, with manga critic Takano Shinzo calling The Man Without Talent "the perfect textbook for seeing through the current conditions of advanced capitalism and middle-class society", and Nicholson noting how the series extends beyond mere self-pity for the protagonist to examine "how the need to have money under capitalism manufactures self-loathing that leads to an even greater inability to act."

The film adaptation was awarded the FIPRESCI Award at the Venice Film Festival in 1991.

=== Legacy and impact ===
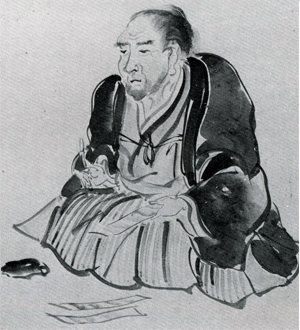
Inoue Seigetsu

The Man Without Talent did not enjoy particular commercial success during its original serialization; the circulation of Comic Baku never exceeded 5,000 copies. The release of the series' film adaptation, which coincided with the bursting of the Japanese asset price bubble, led to renewed critical recognition for The Man Without Talent and for works by Tsuge generally. This so-called "Tsuge boom" resulted in a substantial increase in Tsuge's popularity, and prompted the production of multiple films adapted from the author's manga. The collected edition of The Man Without Talent would go on to become a bestseller, with translator Ryan Holmberg describing the series as "arguably Tsuge's most popular and accessible work". This renewed recognition is additionally credited with prompting a revival in popularity for the haiku poet Inoue Seigetsu, whose poetry is featured prominently in the final chapter of the manga.
