= A Single Match =

Japanese manga series

- The Drawn & Quarterly cover of A Single Match, showing a panel from the titular story

マッチ一本の話 (Matchi Ippon no Hanashi)
- Manga
- Written by: Oji Suzuki
- Published by: Seirindo
- English publisher: Drawn & Quarterly
- Magazine: Garo
- Published: January 4, 2011
- Volumes: 1

A Single Match (Japanese: マッチ一本の話, Hepburn: Matchi Ippon no Hanashi) is a Japanese short story gekiga manga collection written and illustrated by Oji Suzuki. Suzuki originally wrote the stories during the 1970s for Seirindo's alternative manga magazine Garo, which collected them in 1985. Drawn & Quarterly published the manga in North America on January 4, 2011.

== Plot ==
"Color of Rain" (雨の色, Ame no Iro)
A boy runs home in the rain, becoming sick. As he lays in bed, he tells his grandmother that he saw his older brother, but she tells him he is an only child. He dreams of his brother enticing him to ride a train with him which ascends to the sky and his brother disappears. When the boy awakes, he calls for his grandmother.
"Highway Town" (街道の町, Kaidō no Machi)
Kyoko is an old woman who lives with a cat behind an elementary school, surviving on a stipend from the town hall and leftover lunches from the school. She reminisces on when she used to light street lamps on the way to meet her love, a brick factory worker. Recently the owner of the oil shop attempted to rape her but left when he realized she had her period. As she lay in bed, Kyoko realized she was pregnant.
"A Single Match" (マッチ一本の話, Matchi Ippon no Hanashi)
A young boy on the road stops a man for a match. The boy had left his house playing his harmonica. At the outskirts of town, a traveling salesman told him of a boy on the other side of the mountains who also plays the harmonica well. He imagines himself In the plains, finding a house where he thinks he heard a harmonica playing, but it is only a family who tells him that the boy joined a music troupe. The boy continues traveling for a long time until he comes to a small mountain town. There, he stays for three and a half years and has his eye on a girl who is scared of lighting matches. The boy continues traveling until he becomes an old man, admiring the stars along the way.
"Tale of Remembrance" (思い出物語, Omoide Monogatari)
"World Colored Pants"
"Evening Primrose"
"Town of Song" (歌の町, Uta no Machi)
"Crystal Thoughts"
"Mountain Town" (山の町, Yama no Machi)
"Fruit of the Sea" (海の実, Umi no Mi)
"City of Dreams" (夢の棲む市, Yume no Sumu Shi)

== Release ==
The stories in the manga were written by Suzuki during the 1970s for Seirindo's alternative manga magazine Garo, which collected them in 1985. Drawn & Quarterly published the manga in North America on January 4, 2011. The manga had also been previously published in In France under the title Le Kimono Rouge (The Red Kimono) by Seuil.

== Reception ==
Chris Mautner of The Comics Journal observed that the manga is "enigmatic and elliptical enough to frustrate and confound even an attentive reader", noting its blurring of perception, fragmented narratives, and its poetic ambitions. Mautner lamented that there wasn't more background material and concluded that the manga will likely require multiple readings, although the award for doing so might not be obvious. Noel Murray of The A.V. Club noted the dreamlike quality of the manga's art and how it tries to explore reveries, concluding that it is a striking "sketch of the woes and wonders of everyday life that makes room for those moments when we zone out." Hillary Brown of Paste called the manga "irritatingly vague", finding a cultural barrier to understanding it like its background noises, concluding that the manga is too unsatisfying to make up for its weak narrative. Richard Pachter of The Miami Herald called Suzuki "terrific and challenging", saying that the manga is fitting of gekiga, calling the art "rich and vibrant" and noting the manga's aspects of "whimsy and fantasy".

The manga was nominated for a 2012 Harvey Award in the "Best American Edition of Foreign Material" category.
