= Tsuno =

Tsuno may refer to:

== People ==
- Yūko Tsuno (born 1966), Japanese manga artist and doujin writer

== Places ==
- Tsuno, Kōchi, a town in Kōchi Prefecture
- Tsuno, Miyazaki, a town in Miyazaki Prefecture
- Tsuno District, Yamaguchi, a former district in Yamaguchi Prefecture
