= Shinji Nagashima =

Japanese manga artist

Shinji Nagashima 永島 慎二
- Nagashima
- Born: Shin'ichi Nagashima 永島 眞一; July 8, 1937; Kita, Tokyo, Japan
- Died: June 10, 2005 (aged 67)
- Education: assistant to Osamu Tezuka
- Known for: Manga
- Movement: Shōnen manga, Seinen manga, Alternative manga
- Awards: Shogakukan Manga Award; Japan Cartoonists Association Award

Shin'ichi Nagashima (永島 眞一, Nagashima Shin'ichi; July 8, 1937 – June 10, 2005), better known by the pen name Shinji Nagashima (永島 慎二, Nagashima Shinji), was a Japanese manga artist born in Tokyo, Japan. His pseudonym came about due to a publisher's error when printing his name, and he continued using the pseudonym after that.

His oldest son is classical guitarist Shiki Nagashima.

== History ==
From the time he was in junior high school, Nagashima aspired to become a manga artist. After dropping out of school during junior high, he worked as a paperboy and a tofu salesman. He made his professional debut as a manga artist in 1952 with his story Sansho no Piri-chan (さんしょのピリちゃん).

After becoming acquainted with Osamu Tezuka due to occasionally living at Tokiwa-sō, he became Tezuka's assistant. While there, he formed the group Musashi Production with artists including Atsushi Sugimura (who was working under the pseudonym Kontarō), Kyūta Ishikawa and Kuni Fukai (who was working under the pseudonym Hirō Fukai).

He soon became friends with several members of the Gekiga Kōbō, including Yoshihiro Tatsumi and Takao Saito, while living in a provincial temple. After the breakup of Gekiga Kōbō, Nagashima began working for Saitō Production and his work began to reflect a more cinematic and dramatic feel. During this time, he began a somewhat wandering lifestyle living in Shinjuku.

In 1961, Nagashima published The Harsh Story of a Manga Artist (漫画家残酷物語, Mangaka Zankoku Monogatari), a story which showed the "other side" of the manga industry and which brought Nagashima to the forefront of that industry.

He continued publishing new works in a variety of magazines such as COM and Garo, and due to his unusual style began to be called the "father of seinen manga". From 1964 to 1966, he worked at Mushi Production working on anime television series such as Jungle Taitei, and later again worked for Mushi as a character designer on Wansa-kun (1973).

Nagashima won the Shogakukan Manga Award for his Hanaichi Monme (花いちもんめ) in 1972. Two years later, he won the Japan Cartoonists Association Award for Manga Lunch Box (漫画のおべんとう箱, Manga no Obentō Hako).

Beginning in the 1980s, he began releasing fewer series, and went into semi-retirement. He was diagnosed with diabetes, which subsequently caused him to begin having dialysis treatments in 2000. Nagashima died of heart failure on June 10, 2005, at a Tokyo hospital.

== Works ==
- Beloved Pet Dog Taro (愛犬タロ, Aiken Taro) (1956, Shōjo)
- The Harsh Story of a Manga Artist (漫画家残酷物語, Mangaka Zankoku Monogatari) (1961–1964, Keiji)
- Wonderful Parent and Child (ステッキ親子, Sutekki Oyako) (1962, Akahata)
- The Seven Runts (チビッコセブン, Chibikko Sebun) (1964, Atom Club)
- Genta and Okkaa (源太とおっかあ, Genta to Okkaa) (1967, Shōnen King)
- Wanderer (フーテン, Fūten) (1967–1970, COM, Garo, Play Comic)
- Jūdō Icchokusen (柔道一直線) (1967, written by Ikki Kajiwara, Shōnen King, was later adapted into a drama starring Ken'ichi Sakuragi)
- A Flower Blooms in the Forest of the Heart (心の森に花の咲く, Kokoro no Mori ni Hana no Saku) (1968–1969, Wakamono)
- The Young Ones (若者たち, Wakamono-tachi) (1970)
- Manga Youth History (まんが若者史, Manga Wakamonoshi) (1971, Perfect Liberty)
- Image Calendar (イメージ・カレンダー, Imēji Karendā) (1971–1973, high school course books)
- Hanaichi Monme (花いちもんめ) (1971, Weekly Shōnen Sunday)
- Street of Angels (天使のいる街, Tenshi no Iru Machi) (1972, Shinfujin)
- Sabu the Tease (いじめっ子サブ, Ijimekko Sabu) (1972, Shōnen King)
- The Young Traveler (旅人くん, Tabibito-kun) (1972–1973)
- Miracle Girl Limit-chan (ミラクル少女リミットちゃん, Mirakuru Shōjo Rimitto-chan) (1973–1974)
- Night on the Galactic Railroad (銀河鉄道の夜, Ginga Tetsudō no Yoru) (1996, based on the novel by Kenji Miyazawa, NHK Publishing)
- The World of Shinji Nagashima (永島慎二の世界, Nagashima Shinji no Sekai) (2006, Chikuma Shūpansha)

=== Essays ===
- The Republic of Shinji Nagashima (永島慎二共和国, Nagashima Shinji Kyōwakoku) (1981, Daiwa Shobō)
- Midnight Laundry (真夜中のせんたく, Mayonaka no Sentaku) (1983, Kizukisha Bijutsu Shuppan)
- Like a Stranger in Asagaya (阿佐谷界隈怪人ぐらいだあ, Asagaya Kaiwai Kaijin Gurai daa) (1984, Obunsha)
