= Heta-uma =

Japanese manga movement

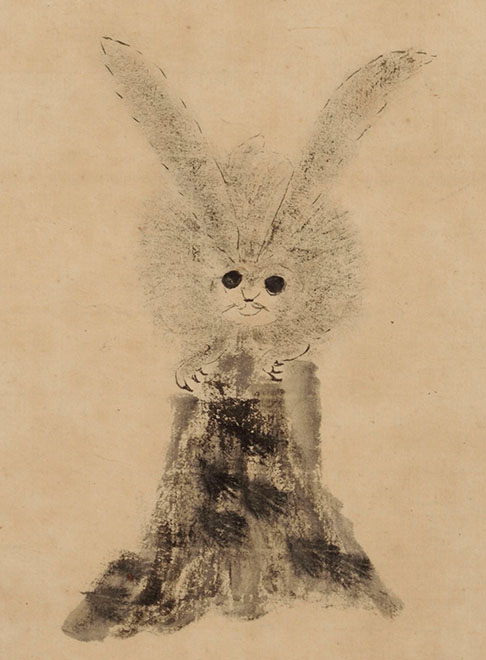
Tokugawa Iemitsu's "Rabbit painting" is considered by modern viewers to be a pioneering example of heta-uma.

Heta-uma (ヘタウマ or ヘタうま) is a Japanese underground manga movement started in the 1970s with the magazine Garo. Heta-uma can be translated as "bad but good", designating a work which looks poorly drawn, but with an aesthetically conscious quality, opposed to the polished look of mainstream manga.

Some of heta-uma's main artists are Teruhiko Yumura (pen name "King Terry"), Yoshikazu Ebisu and Takashi Nemoto.

== History ==
Illustrator Shoji Yamafuji recalled hearing the term "heta-uma" for the first time while visiting an illustration exhibition in the early 1970s.

One of the most influential heta-uma works is Penguin Gohan, illustrated by Teruhiko Yumura and written by Shigesato Itoi. It was serialized in the alternative manga magazine Garo in 1976 and influenced many artists to adopt its artistic philosophy. Following this boom, the heta-uma approach would be seen in both commercial art and original work for exhibition.

The number of heta-uma works increased through the early 1980s and declined by the end of the decade, possibly due to the bubble economy affecting its use in marketing.
