= Offshore Lightning =

Japanese manga collection

Offshore Lightning (夕暮れへ, Yūgure e; "Toward/To Dusk/Twilight") is a manga collection of works written and illustrated by Nazuna Saito. (Note: The English edition writes the author's name in Japanese order, Saito Nazuna.) The collection was first published in Japan as Yūgure e by Seirin Kogeisha, in March 2018. The collection is published in English by Drawn and Quarterly, with Alexa Frank as the translator.

The collection, a gekiga, has ten comics. The themes of the collection include becoming older and death. It includes an essay by Mitsuhiro Asakawa.

This was the first work by Saito available in English.

== Works ==
The collection's works include:

- "Toward The Sunset" (夕暮れへ Yūgure e)
- "Offshore Lightning" (沖の稲妻 Oki no Inazuma)
- "Parakeet God" (インコの神 Inko no Kami)
- "Buy Dog Food and Go Home" (ドッグフードを買ってお家に帰ろう Doggu Fūdo o Katte Oie ni Kaerou)
- "Countdown" (カウントダウン)
- "A Mother of Pearl Ship" (螺鈿の舟 Tsubuen no Fune)
- "Gingko" (銀杏 Ichō)
- "Upskirt" (スカートの中 Sukāto no Naka)
- "In Captivity" (トラワレノヒト Toraware no Hito) (2012)
- "Solitary Death Building" (ぼっち死の館 Botchi Shi no Tate) (2015)

== Reception ==
Publishers Weekly gave the book a starred review, stating that the work is "stellar".

Terry Hong of Booklist stated that the translation was done "seamlessly".
