= Yoshikazu Ebisu =

Japanese manga artist and actor

Yoshikazu Ebisu (蛭子能収, Ebisu Yoshikazu; born 21 October 1947) is a Japanese manga artist and actor.

== Biography ==
Born in Amakusa, Kumamoto Prefecture, Ebisu grew up in Nagasaki. During childhood, he experienced the trauma of post-World War II Japan and atomic weapons. He drew manga since he was a child, influenced by Osamu Tezuka and Mitsuteru Yokoyama, being especially an avid reader of the latter's series Tetsujin 28-go. In the late 1950s, Ebisu discovered the emerging gekiga genre and was immediately affected. "My interests and my themes changed", he recalled, "I moved from giant robots to human beings and realistic stories." Furthermore, he attributed great importance to the influence of American action films, in particular The Last Command directed by Frank Lloyd and starring John Wayne, which inspired him to invent increasingly original and intense representations in the use of works.

In 1970, he moved to Tokyo. His manga appeared for the first time in the avant-garde manga magazine Garo on 19 August 1973, at the end of the first golden period of Japanese underground manga, and his grotesque and darkly surreal works immediately became a mainstay of the genre. Themes and drawings that explore how social issues are affected by absurdist reality and individual frustrations of modern life in contemporary society, often characterized by antisocial, irrational, nonsensical, and anti-realistic aspects with a surreal, black comedic twist. Some of his featured works include his debut comic Pachinko (パチンコ), as well as the Salaryman (サラリーマン) series.

In recent years, Ebisu became mainly known as a television star, collaborating with Takeshi Kitano.

== Bibliography ==
=== English translation ===
Year	Title	Publisher	ISBN	Notes
2019	The Pits of Hell	Breakdown Press	9781911081081	Originally published in Japanese in 1981. English translation by Ryan Holmberg
2023	I Wish I Was Stupid	Breakdown Press	9781911081258	Originally published in 1982 in Japanese. English translation by Ryan Holmberg.

== See also ==
- Heta-uma
- Gekiga
- Garo
