= The Sky Is Blue with a Single Cloud =

Short story collection by Kuniko Tsurita

The Sky Is Blue with a Single Cloud is a collection of short stories by Kuniko Tsurita, published in English by Drawn and Quarterly in 2020. Ryan Holmberg is the translator. It was the first collection of Tsurita's work published in English.

The comics focus on female characters.

The English version includes an essay: Mitsuhiro Asakawa started the essay, and Holmberg expanded it.

== Contents ==
The first comic is "Nonsense", written when Tsurita was a teenager. Brian Nicholson of The Comics Journal described it as "an uncomplicated fable" in which people who follow "wrongheaded delusions" face negative consequences.

== Reception ==
Publishers Weekly gave the collection a starred review.
