= Minami-kun no Koibito =

Japanese manga

南くんの恋人
- Manga
- Written by: Shungicu Uchida
- Published by: Seirindo
- Magazine: Garo
- Original run: October 1986 – June 1987
- Volumes: 1
- Television drama
- Original network: TBS
- Original run: 28 April 1990
- Television drama
- Original network: TV Asahi
- Original run: 10 January 1994 – 21 March 1994
- Episodes: 10 + 1 SP
- Television drama
- Original network: TV Asahi
- Original run: 8 July 2004 – 16 September 2004
- Episodes: 11
- Television drama
- Original network: Fuji TV
- Original run: 10 November 2015 – 2 February 2016
- Episodes: 10
- Television drama
- Original network: TV Asahi
- Original run: 16 July 2024 – 10 September 2024
- Episodes: 8

Minami-kun no Koibito (南くんの恋人; "Minami's sweetheart"), also known as My Little Lover, is a Japanese manga series by Shungicu Uchida. It has been adapted into five Japanese television dramas. The manga has been released in France by Éditions IMHO with the title La petite amie de Minami. The theme song of the 2004 drama series is "Hitomi no Naka no Galaxy" by Arashi.

== 1990 cast ==
- Hikari Ishida as Chiyomi
- Masaki Kudo as Hiroyuki Minami
- Yasuyo Shirashima
- Naoki Miyashita
- Midori Kiuchi
- Shungicu Uchida
- Haruko Kato

== 1994 cast ==
- Yumiko Takahashi as Chiyomi Horikiri
- Shinji Takeda as Hiroyuki Minami
- Reiko Chiba as Risako Nomura
- Masao Kusakari as Chiyomi's father
- Junji Takada as Hiroyuki's father

== 2004 cast ==
- Kyoko Fukada as Chiyomi Horikiri: Another top student and calligrapher who is Susumu's girlfriend. She shrinks down to 16 cm(6 inches) from a curse when he leaves her.
- Kazunari Ninomiya as Susumu Minami: A handsome runner who is Chiyomi's boyfriend and the object of Reika's affections.
- Mao Miyaji as Reika Nomura: A top class student who uses her looks to try and win Minami over. However, Susumu doesn't like her for a personal reason. Wasn't very nice to Chiyomi until much later when Reika realizes how much she did relate to her.
- Asami Abe as Sakura Minami: Susumu's younger sister.
- Masahiko Nishimura as Kenichi Minami: Susumu's father who is hard on him to focus on his studies. He came close a few times to discovering Chiyomi in his son's room.
- Seiichi Tanabe as Seiichiro Kusakabe: Chiyomi's 2nd cousin and Senji's nephew who works as a teacher.
- Soichiro Kitamura as Senji Horikiri: Chiyomi's grandfather who taught her calligraphy and was strict in raising her when her mother(Senji's daughter), Mariko died. When he suffered another heart attack, Susumu and Chiyomi does the right thing to explain themselves to him.
- Tomoya Ishii as Koshiku Ohara: Susumu's best friend who finds out about Chiyomi in her shrunken form. Ohara is the only one who helped find ways to keep others from finding the truth.
- Yuko Natori as Takeko Minami: Susumu's mother who helps Reika cope with her lack of communication with her own parents.

== 2015 cast ==
- Maika Yamamoto as Chiyomi Horikiri: Member of the dance club and writing her own fantasy stories, which she posts online in installments. Former childhood friend and sweetheart of Shunichi. She shrinks to 15 cm after wishing to go back to her childhood days and a fight she had with her parents
- Taishi Nakagawa as Shunichi Minami: Former childhood friend and sweetheart of Chiyomi who formerly practiced kendo and whose father left them when he was younger. He is preparing himself for medical school – he hopes to become a doctor
- Erina Nakayama as Sayuri Nomura: A classmate of both Shunichi and Chiyomi. She relates to Shunichi due to a similar situation she is in with her mother disappearing. Most of the male students swoon over Sayuri, giving her the nickname "Pheromones" because they find her so sexy, but she does not seem to have any friends. She is head over heals for Shunichi and often pursues him. When she openly admits her feelings for him, he eventually turns her down and in the end, finally admits his feelings for Chiyomi.
- Mirai Suzuki as Riku Tagaki: Another classmate who is friends with Chiyomi and Ami. Riku has feelings for Chiyomi and doesn't like Shunichi for the way he treats her. He suspects that Minami had something to do with Chiyomi's disappearance. In episode 9, Riku learns the truth and confronts Shunichi about it. This leads to him learning about Chiyomi's shrunken form and her true reason for disappearing (she is actually in hiding).
- Riko Yoshida as Asuka Horikiri: Chiyomi's sister, who is kind to her. She is friends with Shunichi Minami and is the only one aside from Sayuri he hasn't acted cold around. In Episode 8: she is the first to learn about Chiyomi's shrunken form apart from Shunichi and tries to keep the secret.
- Naomi Akimoto as Noriko Horikiri: Chiyomi's strict mother who is a realist, but is also secretly a romantic. She finds Chiyomi in her shrunken form in Episode 10 after Shunichi is in an accident.
- Narimi Arimori as Emiko Minami: Shunichi's mother who is worried about her son. Her husband left her, which put her in a bind, having to raise her son alone, but she no longer holds it against him. She later discovers his relationship with Kana and accepts his petition for divorce.
- Moe Sasaki as Ami Mikimoto: Chiyomi's best friend, who is in the same dance club. She may have a crush on Riku, but keeps it top secret.
- Ichirota Miyagawa as Noburo Minami: Shunichi's father who mysteriously disappears during junior high. He taught Shunichi kendo. It is eventually revealed in episode 5 that Noburo is in a relationship with Sayuri's mother, Kana.
- Kouichi Oohori as Jouji Horikiri: Chiyomi's father who works as a florist. He is also strict with Chiyomi when it comes to her future. In Episode 10, he learns about Chiyomi being tiny and faints upon seeing her in Noriko's purse
- Kazue Tsunogae as Tomiko Minami: Shunichi's grandmother, who tells him and Chiyomi the legends of Issun-boshi and the one-inch princess known as Issun-hime. Tomiko learns about Chiyomi's shrinking in episode 6, though at first she believes she is the one-inch princess of the legend.

== 2024 cast ==
- Ai Iinuma as Chiyomi Horikiri
- Yūsei Yagi as Hiroyuki Minami
- Yōji Iwase as Etō
- Mariko Kaga as Yuriko
- Yoshino Kimura as Kaede
- Shigeru Moroi as Hisako Kimura
- Ken Mitsuishi as Shinichi Yamataka
- Ikki Sawamura as Haruyuki
- Rena Takeda as Misuzu Sagawa
- Shinji Takeda as Shintaro Horikiri
- Nao Yamato as Nami Takamura
