= Shungicu Uchida =

Japanese writer and actor

Shigeko Uchida (内田 滋子, Uchida Shigeko), known by the pen name Shungicu Uchida (内田春菊, Uchida Shungiku), is a Japanese manga artist, novelist, essayist, actress, and singer.

== Biography ==
She was born August 7, 1959, in Nagasaki, Nagasaki Prefecture, Japan. Her father left the family when she and her younger sister were in primary school. Her mother was a dance teacher and bar hostess, who soon began living with another dance instructor, and later remarried. Shungiku was often forced to sleep with her stepfather, and her mother would allow it. One of Shungiku's happiest memories from her childhood was getting a ream of rough paper from her fourth grade teacher, as a gift for saying that her dream was to become a manga artist.

Shungiku dropped out of high school in her second year and worked in restaurants, bars, in a printshop, and as a domestic. Sometimes she slept under bridges. Five years later she left Nagasaki for Tokyo with her beloved manga and $7,000 in savings. She graduated from Nagasaki Prefectural Nagasaki Minami High School. She then attended Keio University, majoring in philosophy in the Department of Literature, but left before completing a degree. Uchida is currently represented by the talent management firm Knockout.

She published her first works in erotic magazines. Together with other female artists who worked for hentai magazines such as Kyoko Okazaki, Erica Sakurazawa and Yōko Kondo, she is sometimes referred to as "onna no ko H mangaka" ("women H cartoonists").

Her representative works include Wakaokusama Tamajigoku and Minami-kun no Koibito (which was later adapted into three drama series). Uchida is also known as "Denko-chan", the mascot character for The Tokyo Electric Power Company.

Besides a career as a manga artist, she is also active with music and as a novelist. She wrote a controversial semi-autobiographical book called "Fatherfucker" which was also made into a live-action movie.

== Manga ==
- Shiirakansu Brains (1984)
- Minami-kun no Koibito (南くんの恋人, 1986–1987, published in Garo)
- Nami no Ma Ni Ma Ni (subtitled "An Old-fashioned Love Elegy") (1988)
- Isshinjō no Tsugō ("A Personal Affair") (1988)
- Maboroshi no Futsū Shōjo ("The Illusory Ordinary Girl") (1991)
- Kedarui Yoru ni (1992)
- Monokage ni Ashibyōshi ("Marking Time in the Shadows") (1992)
- Watashitachi wa Hanshoku Shite ("We Are Reproducing") (1994)
- Omae no Kaa-chan Bitch! (1994)
- Me wo Tojite Daite ("Close Your Eyes And Hold Me") 目を閉じて抱いて (1996-2000) 5 Volumes, published in Shodensha 祥伝社 FEELコミックス

== Filmography ==
- Akumu Tantei 2 a.k.a. Nightmare Detective 2
- Gumi. Chocolate. Pine (2007)
- Kyacchi boruya (2006)
- Kain no matsuei a.k.a. Cain's Descendant
- Ame no machi a.k.a. The Vanished (2006)
- Yokubo a.k.a. Desire (2006)
- Yumeno (2005)
- Tsuki to Cherry (2004)
- Koi no mon a.k.a. Otakus in Love(2004)
- Mask de 41 (2004)
- Showa Kayo Daizenshu a.k.a. Karaoke Terror (2003)
- Stacy a.k.a. Stacy: Attack of the Schoolgirl Zombies (2001)
- Bijitâ Q a.k.a. Love Cinema Vol. 6 and Visitor Q (2001)
- Kao (2000)

== Television ==
- Gakko no kaidan G (1998)
- Love Letter (1998)
- Gozonji! Fundoshi zukin (1997)
- Hotaru no yado (1997)
- Skip (1996) (TV)
- Otenki-oneesan (1996)
- Midori (1996)
- Tokiwa-so no seishun (1996)
- Muma (1994)
