= Kuniko Tsurita =

Japanese manga artist

Kuniko Tsurita つりたくにこ
- Born: October 25, 1947
- Died: June 14, 1985 (aged 37)
- Area: Manga artist

Kuniko Tsurita (つりたくにこ, Tsurita Kuniko; (1947-1985) was a Japanese manga artist. She was the first woman to be published in the manga magazine Garo and its only regular female comic artist.

== History ==
Tsurita began drawing manga as a teenager and submitting her work to magazine contests, but it was not well received in part because women were expected to create shoujo romance stories, not action stories. One editor wrote "I would recommend you stick with subject matter that you're familiar with and draw about girls instead.". She later found success publishing in the alternative manga magazine Garo.

Tsurita died of complications from lupus in 1985 at the age of 37.

== Style and Themes ==
Many of Tsurita's manga were in gekiga style.

Tsurika's work explores and subverts themes of women's gender roles and patriarchal ideas of femininity, gender identity, and sexuality. Some of her work feature androgynous or gender nonconforming self-cameos.

Tsurika has a varied visual style, ranging from sparse simple drawings that make use of blank space to elaborate scenes inspired by Pop Art and Art Nouveau.

== Works ==
This list may not be comprehensive.

=== Collections in Japanese ===
- フライト: つりたくにこ作品集 (Flight: The Works of Kuniko Tsurita). Seirin Kōgeisha, 2010.
- 彼方へ: つりたくにこ未発表作品集 (Beyond: Unpublished works of Kuniko Tsurita). Seirin Kōgeisha, 2001.
- 六の宮姫子の悲劇 (The Tragedy of Princess Rokunomiya). Seirin Kōgeisha, 2001.

=== Translated Collections ===
- Flight has been translated into:
  - Italian by V. Filosa. Coconino Press, 2019. ISBN 9788876184345
  - French by Léopold Dahan. Atrabile, 2021. ISBN 9782889231010
  - Spanish by Yoko Ogihara and Fernando Cordobés. Gallo Nero Ediciones, 2024. ISBN 9788419168528
- The Sky Is Blue with a Single Cloud, translated by Ryan Holmberg. Drawn & Quarterly Publications, 2020. ISBN 9781770463981
