= Yuji Kamosawa =

Japanese manga artist and illustrator

Yuji Kamosawa (Japanese: 鴨沢祐仁, 1952–2008) was a Japanese cartoonist.

== Biography ==
Kamosawa was born in Iwate prefecture in 1952, and made his debut in 1975 with The Invention by Xie (クシー君の発明) published in the manga magazine Garo. He worked as a freelancer after working as a graphic designer for a confectionery maker and a stationery maker. His representative works include the "Xie" series about a boy living in the mysterious Platoon City, and the cover art of the magazine Bikkuri House. He died suddenly in January 2008. Yuji Kamosawa's worldview was strongly influenced by the writer Taruho Inagaki. His work Mr. Xie's Night Walk (クシー君の夜の散歩) was considered particularly outstanding.

His illustrations were used in music for the jackets of "Bikkuri Aquarium" and "Science Fiction" produced by Keiichi Suzuki, as well as for the Moonriders tribute album. The singer-songwriter Masahito Arai was also a fan and used many of Kamosawa's illustrations for the jackets of his solo albums. In memory of his death in 2008, the collection of his unpublished manuscript was published under the title Xie's Club Book in 2018.
