= Teruhiko Yumura =

Japanese illustrator

- 湯村 輝彦
- Born: November 1, 1942 (age 83); Hakuzu, Shinjuku-ku, Tokyo
- Education: Tama Art University

Teruhiko Yumura (湯村 輝彦, Yumura Teruhiko; born November 1, 1942) is a Japanese illustrator, designer, cartoonist and music critic. He is one of the exemplars of the heta-uma illustration aesthetic. Born in Hakuzu, Shinjuku-ku, Tokyo (currently Nishi-Shinjuku), he signed works under the pen names "Terry Johnson" (Gonzo), "FLAMINGO TERRY", "FRAMINA TERRENO GONZO", "TERRINO FLAMINI 'GONZAREZ" and "KURUZURU Terumanta". Yumura is known by the nickname "King Terry".

Yumura studied at Tama Art University and drew covers for the magazine Garo in the 1970s and 1980s. He collaborated with copywriter Shigesato Itoi in short comics such as Penguin Shuffle and Jonetsu Penguin no Gohan. He also collaborated with the American magazines Wet and Raw. Yumura's comics were influenced by Japanese and American pop culture; his artwork is characterized by crudely done drawings made in a conscious, deliberate manner. This style became known as heta-uma (bad but good).
