= Shin'ichi Abe =

Japanese manga artist (1950–2026)

- 安部 慎一
- Born: 7 April 1950; Tagawa, Allied-occupied Japan
- Died: 4 September 2026 (aged 76)
- Occupation: Manga artist

Shin'ichi Abe (Japanese: 安部 慎一 Abe Shin'ichi; 7 April 1950 – 4 September 2026) was a Japanese manga artist.

Abe joined the magazine Garo when he was 20 years old and had his works extend to the European sphere in the 2000s.

Abe died from mandibular gland cancer on 4 September 2026, at the age of 76.

== Publications ==
- That Miyoko Asagawa Feeling (1971)
- Shiseikatsu: Abe Shinichi Tanpenshū (2000)
- Hi no Kōfun (2001)
- Airen no Kazoku (2001)
- Hakushin no Bi o Motomete (2001)
- Tengoku (2002)
- Boku wa Sarakin no Hoshi desu! (2003)
- Miyoko Tagawa Kibun (2021)
