= Kamui (1964 manga) =

Japanese manga series by Sanpei Shirato

- Cover of the first English edition of Kamui Den under the title The Legend of Kamui, published by Drawn & Quarterly

カムイ
- Genre: Adventure; Epic; Historical
- Manga

Kamui Den
- Written by: Sanpei Shirato
- Published by: Seirindo
- English publisher: NA: Drawn & Quarterly
- Magazine: Garo
- Original run: December 1, 1964 – July 1, 1971
- Volumes: 21
Further information
Manga
Kamui Gaiden
Written by	Sanpei Shirato
Published by	Shogakukan
English publisher	NA: Viz Comics/Eclipse Comics
Magazine	Weekly Shōnen Sunday
Original run	May 1, 1965 – January 4, 1967
Volumes	3
Anime television series
Ninpu Kamui Gaiden
Directed by	Yonehiko Watanabe
Produced by	Shigeto Takahashi; (Zuiyo)
Music by	Ryōichi Mizutani
Studio	TCJ
Original network	Fuji TV
Original run	April 6, 1969 – September 28, 1969
Episodes	26
Anime film
Kamui Gaiden: Tsukihigai no Maki
Directed by	Yonehiko Watanabe
Written by	Junji Tashiro
Music by	Ryōichi Mizutani; Tadashi Ōkura
Studio	TCJ Video Center Co., Ltd
Released	March 20, 1971
Manga
Kamui Gaiden Dai-ni-bu
Written by	Sanpei Shirato
Published by	Shogakukan
English publisher	NA: Viz Comics/Eclipse Comics
Magazine	Big Comic
Original run	February 25, 1982 – March 25, 1987
Volumes	20
Manga
Kamui Den Da Ni-bu
Written by	Sanpei Shirato
Illustrated by	Tetsuji Okamoto
Published by	Shogakukan
Magazine	Big Comic
Original run	May 5, 1988 – April 10, 2000
Volumes	22
Manga
Kamui Gaiden: Reunion
Written by	Sanpei Shirato
Illustrated by	Tetsuji Okamoto
Published by	Shogakukan
Magazine	Big Comic
Original run	September 25, 2009 – October 24, 2009
Live-action film
Kamui Gaiden (2009)
- icon

Kamui (Japanese: カムイ伝, Hepburn: Kamui Den) is a Japanese manga series written and illustrated by Sanpei Shirato. It was serialized in Seirindō's monthly gekiga magazine Garo between December 1964 and July 1971, with its chapters collected in 21 tankōbon volumes. Set in feudal Japan, it tells the story of Kamui, a low-born ninja who has fled his clan, which pursues him. It illustrates the true nature of the Edo period and the discrimination that existed within the feudal system. The series combines historical adventure with social commentary and themes of oppression and rebellion that reflect Shirato's Marxist convictions. By October 2021, the series had over 15 million copies in circulation.

A spin-off, titled Kamui Gaiden, (Note: Japanese: カムイ外伝, カムイ伝 第一部, Hepburn: 'Legend of Kamui Continuation, Kamui Gaiden – Part 1') ran in two parts: the first part ran in Shogakukan's Weekly Shōnen Sunday from May 1965 to January 1967; and the second part, titled Kamui Gaiden Dai-ni-bu, (Note: Japanese: カムイ外伝 第二部, Hepburn: 'Kamui Gaiden – Part 2') ran in Shogakukan's magazine Big Comic from February 1982 to March 1987. A sequel, titled Kamui Den Dai Ni-bu, (Note: Japanese: カムイ伝 第二部, Hepburn: 'The Legend of Kamui – Part 2') illustrated by Tetsuji Okamoto, ran in Big Comic from May 1988 to April 2000.

Kamui Gaiden was licensed for English release in North America under the title The Legend of Kamui by Viz Media and Eclipse Comics; in 1967, Kamui Gaiden received an anime adaptation under the title Ninpu Kamui Gaiden that ran for 26 episodes on Fuji TV; the series was also adapted into an anime film in 1971, titled Kamui Gaiden: Tsukihigai no Maki, and a live-action film, titled Kamui Gaiden, in 2009. The series is licensed for English release in North America by Drawn & Quarterly, starting in January 2025.

== Plot ==
Kamui is a ninja from the Edo period who decides to leave his clan, an act that carries with it a death sentence. After doing so, he is pursued relentlessly by the members of his former clan, who consider him to be a traitor and therefore wish to kill him. Kamui wanders around Japan to escape from them using his intelligence and survival abilities. In the course of the series, Kamui begins to suffer from paranoia because of his status as a persecuted man. Kamui starts to believe that everybody wishes to murder him and distrusts everyone he encounters.

Rather than the story of Kamui, much of the first volume is concerned with the drama of tax collecting, crop inspection and the fate of various animals in and around Hanamaki Village, most notably the White Wolf, about whom Shirato states in the Author's Note at the end of the second chapter, "It seems I have gone on for too long about the lives of the wolves. Especially since the life of the white wolf is not related to the human world I am describing simultaneously in this story".

Kamui himself does not make an appearance until Dogs II, still as a baby, nearly 200 pages into the story, and as a full-fledged adolescent character in Yukiwari in chapter 3, The Sword. Kamui is shown to be a member of the lowest class in the feudal caste system, the Burakumin (translated here as "Outcasts"). but is shown, notably in the chapter Kogera I, to be plucky and resourceful, a child who bristles against the very idea of class itself. Shirato states at the end of Arson, the penultimate chapter in the volume, that "It is fair to say that the Legend of Kamui begins now."

== Characters ==
- Main characters:
  - Kamui
  - Ryūnoshin
  - Shōsuke
  - The White Wolf
- Hanamaki village
  - Omine, a servant girl
  - Vice Karō Kusaka Konbei, Ryūnoshin's father
  - The village runner Danzuri, Shōsuke's father
  - Koroku, Omine's father
  - Tachibana Gundayū, Metsuke
  - Sasa Hyōgo, the fencing instructor
  - Sasa Ikkaku, fencing instructor
  - Klusaka Jūbei, village clan elder
  - The Lord of Hioki
  - The Hanamaki Village Headman
  - Tachibana Kazuma, Gundayu's son
  - Ishuin, a scholar
  - Baba Heihachirō, warehouse chief
  - Gosaku, Koroku's father
  - Chikumazara Village Headman
  - Kichibei, a genin farmer rebel leader
  - Nisuke, a rugged Genin child
- Shukudani & Chibukazawa villages
  - Yokome, the outcast chief
  - Saesa, Yokome's wild daughter
  - Kogera, an outcast child
  - Yasuke, Kamui's father
  - Shibutare, the village snitch
- Drifters & animals
  - The Masterless Samurai
  - An Itinerant Priest
  - Wolf Pack
  - Eagle

== Publication ==
Kamui Den manga first appeared on the cover of Garo No. 9, May 1965 (left), and No. 15, August 1965 (right); art by Sanpei Shirato.

An original series written and illustrated by Sanpei Shirato, Kamui Den was serialized in Seirindō's monthly gekiga magazine Garo with a total of 74 installments. The first installment was published in the magazine's December 1, 1964, issue. The series released its final installment in the July 1, 1971, issue of Garo. Seirindō collected its chapters in 21 tankōbon volumes, released from May 10, 1967, to October 10, 1971.

=== English-language publication ===
An English-language edition of Shirato's work was first published in North America in 1987, when VIZ Communications and Eclipse Comics released The Legend of Kamui as a 37-issue series. The series reprinted stories from Kamui Gaiden, the sequel to Kamui-den, rather than the original Kamui-den serialized in Garo from 1964 to 1971. The series was published from June 2, 1987, to November 15, 1988, with VIZ Communications and Eclipse Comics identified as its publishers. It was therefore one of the earliest North American English-language publications of Shirato's work, but it did not make the original Kamui-den available in English.

In November 2023, Drawn & Quarterly announced that it had licensed the original Kamui-den for its first English-language publication. The publisher announced a ten-volume edition under the title The Legend of Kamui, with each volume planned at approximately 600 pages. Manga scholar Ryan Holmberg is editing the series, with the translation led by Richard Rubinger.

The first volume was published on January 14, 2025. The second volume followed in 2025, with both volumes forming part of the planned ten-volume edition. The publication marked the first English-language edition of the original Kamui-den series.

Title	Chapters collected	Publication date	Translation	ISBN
The Legend of Kamui: Volume One	Birth, Kagari, The Sword, Masudori, Arson, Decapitation	January 14, 2025	Richard Rubinger, Noriko Rubinger, Alexa Frank	978-1770467293
The Legend of Kamui: Volume Two	Tabute, Tessan, One-Eye, Smoke Signal, The Tamate Disturbance, Street Vendors, Kasumi-Giri	July 8, 2025	Richard Rubinger, Noriko Rubinger	978-1770467798
The Legend of Kamui: Volume Three	TBD	March 10, 2026	Richard Rubinger, Noriko Rubinger	978-1770468177
The Legend of Kamui: Volume Four	TBD	July 7, 2026	Richard Rubinger, Noriko Rubinger	978-1770468566
The Legend of Kamui: Volume Five	TBD	February 17, 2027	Richard Rubinger, Noriko Rubinger	978-1770468627

=== Spin-off ===
A spin-off manga, titled Kamui Gaiden, was published in two parts by two different Shogakukan magazines. The first part was serialized in Shogakukan's shōnen manga magazine Weekly Shōnen Sunday from May 1, 1965, (Note: It started in the magazine's 21st issue of 1965 (cover date May 16), released on May 1.) to January 4, 1967. (Note: It ended in the magazine's 3rd–4th issue of 1967 (cover date January 15) released on January 4.) The first 16 chapters were collected in two volumes in May 1966 and republished in three volumes in April 1976. The second part, titled Kamui Gaiden Dai-ni-bu, was serialized in the publisher's seinen manga magazine Big Comic from February 25, 1982, to March 25, 1987. Shogakukan collected its chapters in 20 volumes, released from August 1983 to July 1987.

=== Sequels ===
A continuation of the original series, titled Kamui Den Da Ni-bu, illustrated by Tetsuji Okamoto, was serialized in Shogakukan's seinen manga magazine Big Comic from May 10, 1988, to April 10, 2000. Shogakukan collected its chapters in 22 volumes, released from October 1989 to August 2000.

Sanpei Shirato wrote and serialized a three-installment set of short stories in Shogakukan's magazine Big Comic, illustrated by Tetsuji Okamoto, called Kamui Gaiden: Reunion. (Note: Japanese: カムイ外伝 再会, Hepburn: "Kamui Gaiden: Saikai") They ran from September 25 (Note: It began serialization in the magazine's 19th issue of 2009 (cover date October 10), which was released on September 25.) to October 24, 2009. (Note: It ended serialization in the magazine's 21st issue of 2009 (cover date November 10), which was released on October 24.) Shogakukan collected the stories as a one-volume paperback supplement to the September 2018 issue of Sarai magazine.

== Adaptations ==
The screen adaptations associated with the Kamui character have primarily been based on Kamui Gaiden, the later series derived from Kamui-den, rather than directly adapting the original 1964–1971 manga.

=== Anime ===
Kamui Gaiden was adapted into the television anime Ninpū Kamui Gaiden (Note: Japanese: 忍風カムイ外伝), produced by TCJ in association with Zuiyo. The series was broadcast on Fuji TV from April 6 to September 28, 1969, and consisted of 26 episodes. Yonehiko Watanabe served as chief director, with Junji Tashiro as writer and Shūichi Seki as character designer. The series follows Kamui after he abandons the ninja world and becomes a fugitive pursued by other ninja, adapting the central premise and characters of Shirato's Kamui Gaiden.

The production was notable for using animation techniques intended to reproduce aspects of Shirato's manga style. Contemporary descriptions of the series have highlighted its broad ink-based imagery, dynamic action, unusual camera techniques, and comparatively graphic violence, distinguishing it from many television anime of its period.

The series was subsequently edited into the theatrical anime film Kamui Gaiden: Tsukihigai no Maki (Note: Japanese: カムイ外伝 月日貝の巻). The 1971 film, released by Toho, was an approximately 88-minute re-edit of episodes 21 through 26 of the television series, with additional editing and material rather than a wholly new adaptation. It was released in Japanese cinemas on March 20, 1971.

The anime later received English-language exposure in North America. In the mid-1980s, an English-dubbed episode was distributed on videocassette under the title Search of the Ninja, introducing the animated version of Kamui to a North American home-video audience.

=== Live-action film ===
A live-action film adaptation of Kamui Gaiden, directed by Yōichi Sai and starring Kenichi Matsuyama as Kamui, was released in Japan in 2009. The screenplay was written by Sai and Kankurō Kudō, and the film was produced and distributed by Shochiku. The film premiered in Japan on September 19, 2009, and subsequently screened internationally, including at the Toronto International Film Festival.

The film adapts material from Kamui Gaiden rather than the original Kamui-den. Set during the Edo period, it follows Kamui, a former ninja who has fled his clan and seeks freedom while being pursued by assassins and drawn into conflicts involving the fisherman Hanbei and other inhabitants of his new community. The film was subsequently released in English-speaking markets under the title Kamui, with the home-video release also using the title Kamui: The Lone Ninja.

In January 2010, Funimation announced that it had acquired the North American rights to the live-action film. The film subsequently received an English-language release in North America.

== Influence ==
Kamui-den had a major influence on the development of politically engaged gekiga and historical manga. Its large-scale depiction of feudal Japan through the experiences of peasants, outcasts, and other marginalized groups demonstrated the potential of manga as a medium for historical and social analysis. The series became closely associated with Garo and helped establish the magazine as an important venue for experimental and politically oriented manga during the 1960s and 1970s.

The series also influenced artists associated with Shirato's studio. Goseki Kojima worked as one of Shirato's assistants during the production of Kamui-den before establishing himself as a major manga artist. Kojima later became internationally known for Lone Wolf and Cub, his long-running collaboration with writer Kazuo Koike. Although Lone Wolf and Cub was not an adaptation of Kamui-den, Kojima's work on Shirato's series places the two works within the same creative lineage of postwar historical manga.

The influence of Kamui-den was reinforced by the wider legacy of Shirato's manga. His approach to historical storytelling, class conflict, and marginalized communities influenced later generations of manga creators and helped establish a model for politically engaged historical fiction. Shirato's work was particularly influential among artists who sought to move beyond conventional heroic representations of samurai and ninja and instead emphasize the social structures surrounding them.

Kamui Gaiden, the later series centered on Kamui, also contributed to the international influence of Shirato's work. Its English-language publication by VIZ Communications and Eclipse Comics in the 1980s introduced Shirato's manga to an early North American readership, while later creators drew attention to its visual storytelling and treatment of ninja fiction. Manga scholar Ryan Holmberg has identified Kamui Gaiden as an important influence on American comics artist Wendy Pini, co-creator of Elfquest, who encountered the manga in Japanese before a substantial English translation was available. Holmberg has also noted parallels between Kamui Gaiden and the 2016 stop-motion film Kubo and the Two Strings, describing the influence as particularly apparent.

== Reception ==
=== Commercial and cultural impact ===
Kamui became one of the most successful series serialized in Garo, helping establish the magazine as an important venue for politically and formally experimental manga. Its combination of historical adventure, graphic violence, and adult political themes helped distinguish it from contemporary mainstream manga and contributed to the development of gekiga.

The series became closely associated with the student protest culture of the 1960s and 1970s. Manga critic Natsume Fusanosuke wrote that Shirato's work became a symbol for protesters, who identified with its rejection of established class hierarchies and its emphasis on eliminating distinctions between social classes. The manga's historical materialist perspective, depiction of oppression, and recurring conflicts between social classes have consequently been central to critical discussions of Shirato's work.

The series also achieved substantial commercial success. By October 2021, the Kamui series had exceeded 15 million copies in circulation.

The first Drawn & Quarterly volume was also nominated for Best New Edition of Classic Manga at the 2025 American Manga Awards.

=== Critical response ===
In Issue 5 of Gateways, Jeffrey Gomez noted "Visually, The Legend of Kamui is a feast for manga lovers. Its style often hints at the dynamism with which artists like Shirato can evoke with the many other subjects the Japanese enjoy in their comics, such as cooking, hunting and fishing."

Joe McCulloch of The Comics Journal praised the first volume's unusually broad approach to historical storytelling, emphasizing that Shirato Sanpei does not treat Kamui as a conventional ninja adventure centered on a single hero. Instead, the narrative moves among peasants, outcasts, warriors, and members of the ruling class to examine the social mechanisms that produce class conflict. McCulloch particularly highlighted the manga's depiction of the samurai ruling class as exploiting divisions among lower social groups, giving the series a systemic rather than purely character-driven approach to historical fiction.

McCulloch also praised Shirato's extensive historical explanations and the way the manga directly communicates its political perspective. He regarded the work's slower pace as closely connected to its attempt to document the operation of an entire feudal society rather than simply advance an adventure plot. At the same time, he was critical of the limited agency afforded to many of the female characters in the first volume, noting that their roles are frequently associated with suffering and social restriction.

Publishers Weekly praised the first volume as an ambitious mixture of historical fiction, adventure, and political commentary. The review highlighted Shirato's detailed treatment of seventeenth-century life and his attention to labor, agriculture, hunting, and social hierarchy. It argued that these details give the manga a sense of historical breadth while reinforcing its criticism of inequality and injustice.

Nirmala Devi of ArtReview praised the manga's combination of political analysis and melodrama. She noted that Shirato moves between violent episodes of oppression, romance, adventure, and historical exposition, arguing that the mixture allows the political material to remain embedded within an entertaining narrative rather than functioning solely as ideological instruction. Devi characterized the work as simultaneously a historical epic and a melodrama and highlighted its sustained examination of class relations.

Lindsay Pereira of Broken Frontier praised the first volume's ensemble storytelling, arguing that its multiple characters and parallel narratives create a broad portrait of feudal society rather than a conventional hero's journey. He highlighted Shirato's depiction of people whose opportunities are constrained by their social status at birth and argued that the manga's treatment of hierarchy remains relevant despite its historical setting. Pereira also praised the combination of political themes with action, humor, romance, and melodrama, which he considered important to the manga's continuing narrative appeal.

In his review of the second English volume, Pereira described The Legend of Kamui as a powerful treatment of class struggle and praised its increasingly complex exploration of education, social mobility, and hierarchy. He also praised the expansion of the cast and the increasingly elaborate world-building, while noting that the volume's more than 600 pages and numerous storylines make it a demanding read.

Nathan Evans of Popzara praised the manga's political and visual ambition, describing it as both historically significant and effective as popular entertainment. He singled out Shirato's depiction of feudal class relations, his recurring predator-and-prey imagery, and his treatment of samurai as members of a ruling elite rather than idealized heroic figures. Evans also praised the reproduction quality of the Drawn & Quarterly edition and Shirato's detailed artwork. Evans nevertheless criticized the Drawn & Quarterly edition for providing little supplementary material to explain the historical context of the manga. He considered this a drawback given the complexity of Shirato's historical subject matter and the scale of the project, and also noted the considerable commitment required from readers who intend to follow the planned ten-volume edition.

Adam Wescott of Yatta-Tachi praised the manga's depiction of nature, animals, violence, and the interconnected lives of people from different social classes. He argued that the work's refusal to remain centered on one protagonist allows it to portray social conflict from multiple perspectives and to examine the larger structures that shape individual lives.

Wescott also identified the manga's length and density as potential barriers. He noted that the first volume exceeds 600 pages, contains a large cast, and frequently interrupts the narrative with historical and political explanations. He characterized some of Shirato's political presentation as overly didactic, although he considered the same density part of the work's unusually comprehensive depiction of feudal society.

Jeff Provine of Blogcritics praised the work's historical importance and its contribution to the development of gekiga. He emphasized the manga's relationship with Garo and its combination of historical storytelling, social criticism, and graphic action, presenting it as an influential example of politically engaged manga.

== See also ==
- Ninjas in popular culture

== Notes ==
Preceded by GeGeGe no Kitarō (1968 TV series) (April 7, 1968 – March 30, 1969)	Fuji TV Sunday 18:30 Timeslot Ninpu Kamui Gaiden (April 6, 1969 – September 28, 1969)	Succeeded by Sazae-san (October 5, 1969 – )
