= Tadao Tsuge =

Japanese manga artist

Tadao Tsuge (つげ忠男; real name 柘植忠男; born 1941) is a Japanese alternative manga artist. He is known to write stories about the kimin (棄民; the "abandoned" people) and burakumin of Japanese society, as well the men who tried to reintegrate into Japanese society after World War II. Tsuge is one of the first artists to create autobiographical work about growing up in poverty in Tokyo. Some themes explored in his work include post-war trauma, class, poverty, masculinity, sex work, geography, and neighborhood environments. He currently lives in Chiba Prefecture, Japan.

== Early life ==
Tsuge grew up in the Keisei Tateishi neighborhood of Tokyo, Japan. As a child, he would often escape physical abuse at home by wandering the streets of the red-light district. In Granta, Tsuge wrote of his neighborhood, "... I would say that it was a red-light district and a plywood market and a town of hoodlums in one. I'll add one more thing: the whole place stunk of sewage." He continued, "In short, there was nothing special about Keisei Tateishi. It was a neighborhood like so many during the postwar recovery. What was it, then, about the place that left me with so many indelible impressions?"

In the 1950s, when he was a teenager, Tsuge began working for a blood bank business. While working there, he encountered people commonly considered "misfits," "lowlifes," or "damaged", who regularly sold their blood plasma. He continued to work at the blood bank into the 1960s. He also began writing the stories that would appear in Trash Market in the 1960s.

He is the younger brother of Yoshiharu Tsuge, a Japanese cartoon artist.

== Work ==
In 2015, the graphic novel, Trash Market, was published by Drawn & Quarterly, and was edited by Ryan Holmberg. The book, a collection of stories focusing on post-war Japan, follows the gekiga style of manga. The majority of work in the book was originally published between 1968 and 1972 in Garo, an alternative manga magazine. Tsuge also drew from personal experiences in his stories, such as the title story, which recalls his time at the blood bank, and "Song of Showa", which explores his childhood in the red-light district.

The graphic novel Slum Wolf was published by New York Review Comics in 2018, with an introduction by Ryan Holmberg. The book primarily focuses on Tsuge's work published between 1969 and 1976 in Garo. The stories have a bleak and film noir quality, focusing on disenfranchised people in 1960s and 1970s Japan. One main character, Kesei Sabu, was a trained kamikaze pilot, and he roams the streets of Tokyo, looking for fights with men and encounters with sex workers. Another character, Mr. Aogishi, is a relatively submissive business supervisor, who is traumatized by his experiences in World War II. Many of the characters in the book live in precarious housing situations, including temporary homes and rundown buildings.

Ryan Holmberg wrote that Kesei Sabu and Mr. Aogishi were "... the two paradigms of Japanese masculinity that Tadao kept returning to while drawing for manga magazines Garo and Yagyō in the '60s and '70s. As different as they are—one an essay in machismo, the other in impotence—they are two sides of the same coin." Gregory Smith wrote in PopMatters, "One notable feature of these works is the absence of post-war progress or vision of the future. Tsuge creates an eternal present devoid of any benefits of an improving economy or possibility of climbing out of a landscape of ruin and defeat."

== Bibliography ==
- Thrash Market. (Drawn & Quarterly, 2015)
- Slum Wolf. (New York Review Comics, 2018)
- Boat Life Vol. 1. (Floating World Comics, 2022)
- Boat Life Vol. 2. (Floating World Comics, 2026)
