= Yūko Tsuno =

Japanese manga artist (born 1966)

- Born: Japanese 津野 裕子 (Kana, つの ゆうこ); February 5, 1966 (age 60) Takaoka, Toyama, Japan
- Areas: manga artist; doujinshi writer

Yūko Tsuno (Japanese 津野 裕子; Kana, つの ゆうこ; born February 5, 1966) is a Japanese manga artist and doujinshi writer. Her comics, all very short, self-contained works ranging from five to twenty pages, are surreal and dramatic.

Yūko Tsuno was born February 5, 1966, Takaoka, Toyama, Japan.

Tsuno published her first work in 1986 in the May issue of the avant-garde manga magazine, Garo with the six-page short story Reizōko (冷蔵庫). This comic is about a person whose deceased sister is locked in a refrigerator. Shortly after her debut came out, she received offers from mainstream magazines but turned them down, sticking with underground comix. Tsuno creates manga with the attitude of drawing it for herself and not for an audience. By the time Garo was discontinued in 2002, Tsuno had published around 70 other short stories. Seirindō, Garo's publisher, published some of them in three anthologies: Delicious (デリシャス, Derishasu, 1988), Amemiya Seppyō (雨宮雪氷, 1994), and Rinpun Kusuri (鱗粉薬, 2000). In 2000, Tsuno's short story "Swing Shell" (スイングシェル, Suingu Sheru) was published in the English-language anthology Secret Comics Japan, which was intended to provide an overview of the alternative comics scene. After the end of Garo, there were no further releases for a few years. Finally, in 2008, a manga was created for the magazine AX.

Tsuno resides in Fukuyama, Hiroshima, and works in a graphic design studio.

== Selected works ==
=== Author and artist ===
- 1986, Reizōko
- 2000, Secret Comics Japan: Underground Comics Now
- Rinpun Yaku
- 2000, "Swing Shell" (スイングシェル)
