= MariNaomi =

American cartoonist and database maintainer

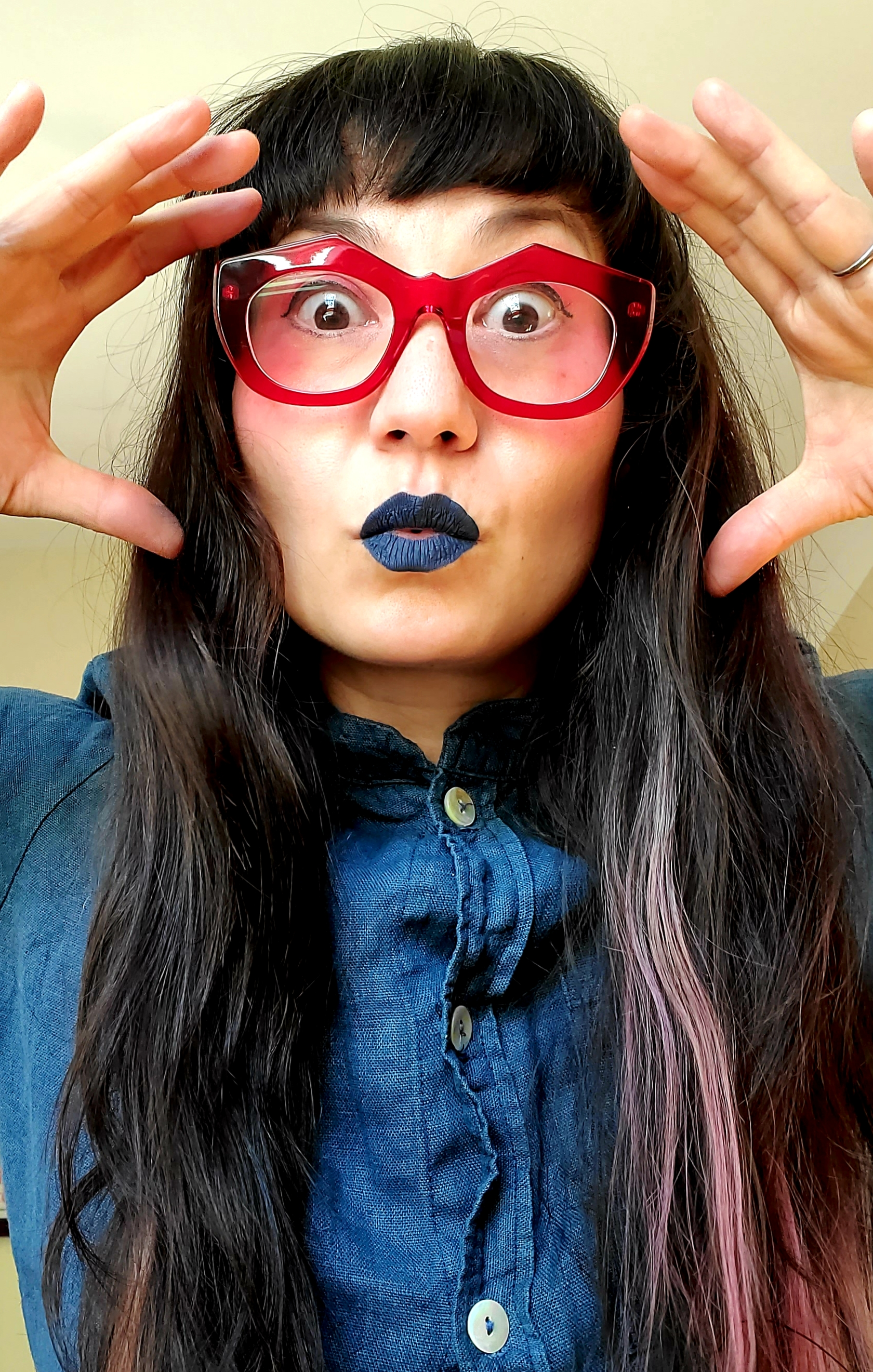
- MariNaomi in 2021
- Born: Mari Naomi Schaal; August 2, 1973 (age 53) Texas, U.S.

MariNaomi (born as Mari Naomi Schaal; born August 2, 1973) is an American graphic artist and cartoonist who often publishes autobiographical comics and is also well-known for creating three online databases of underrepresented cartoonists.

== Career ==
MariNaomi has been drawing comics since 1997, starting out as a zine creator. Their comics are usually autobiographical. They talk about the search for their roots, their status as a mixed race queer woman, as well as their feminism. Their article "Writing People of Color" discusses how people of color should approach writing about people from a race that is not their own. MariNaomi stated "I feel like race is such a sensitive issue that I wanted feedback and I wanted to know how better to do it and to share that information.".

MariNaomi wrote an article It Happened to Me: I Was Sexually Harassed Onstage at a Comic Convention Panel for XOJane in 2013 describing their experience of being harassed on stage as a panelist at a comics convention. They did not name their harasser, but Scott Lobdell later came forward and issued a public apology for his actions.

MariNaomi founded and maintains three online databases of cartoonists: the Cartoonists of Color Database, the Queer Cartoonists Database and the Disabled Cartoonists Database. In 2014, they began the Cartoonists of Color Database and created the Queer Cartoonists Database soon after. In 2019, they launched the Disabled Cartoonists Database. The opt-in per creator database Queer Cartoonists contains 775 entries as of May 2018 and has been reported to be helpful in the professional careers of upcoming cartoonists. Librarians and archivists specializing in comic book studies have also highlighted the need for open access databases like these.

MariNaomi has written and drawn comics columns for several websites, including The Rumpus and SFBAY.ca. In 2016, they were featured at the Smithsonian Asian Pacific American Center conference on imagined futures. MariNaomi’s column on The Rumpus won an honorable mention in Houghton Mifflin’s Best American Comics 2013 and a SPACE prize. Their art can be found in the Smithsonian, De Young Museum, Cartoon Art Museum, Asian Art Museum, the Japanese American Art Museum, and the Yerba Buena Center for the Arts. MariNaomi also taught classes for California College of the Arts Comics MFA program.

Since 2017, they and fellow author Myriam Gurba have been hosting an advice podcast called AskBiGrlz where they answer listener questions. In 2011 and 2018, MariNaomi toured with Sister Spit and is also a guest editor of PEN Illustrated.

In 2021, MariNaomi created a Stop AAPI Hate mural in Garvey Park in Rosemead, California. The comic-strip inspired 60-by10-foot mural covers the side of a recreational park building. Connie Chung Joe of Asian Americans Advancing Justice – Los Angeles said the mural is "a wake-up call that Asian-Americans in this country have been scapegoated. Not just by this pandemic, but time and time again in American history.”

In May 2023, MariNaomi released their book, I Thought You Loved Me. In this book, MariNaomi goes on an emotional, reminiscent journey to try and figure out why their friendship with Jodie ended abruptly with a phone call. They used details from old journal entries and told the story through colorful collages made with mixed media such as drawings, email threads, and postcards. During the publication process, MariNaomi faced budget issues and even a cancellation, until Fieldmouse Press picked it up.

== Personal life ==
Their mother is Japanese and their father is a Caucasian American. Born as Mari Naomi Schaal in Texas in 1973, they grew up in Mill Valley, California and later moved to San Jose, California. They began using the name MariNaomi in 2003. They worked in illegal hostess bars while they briefly lived in Japan. They wrote about those experiences in their memoir, Turning Japanese.

Growing up, MariNaomi felt like they were too white to be classified as Asian but too Asian to be viewed as white. When they were five years old MariNaomi had a fixation on drawing and doodling. When they were 14, they picked up the hobby of yo-yoing. At the same age they began making note of memories as they happened. Despite them struggling to publish their first book, MariNaomi would joke, saying that "I became an overnight star in 14 years."

In 2023, they worked on another publication that traces their childhood to their present life called "I Thought You Loved Me." MariNaomi has been drawing and publishing for 30 years and, through this work, they are able to make their story and experience heard.

== Publications ==
- Kiss & Tell: A Romantic Resume, Ages 0 to 22 (Harper Perennial, 2011) ISBN 0062009230
- Dragon's Breath and Other True Stories (2dcloud/Uncivilized Books, 2014) ISBN 1941250017
- Turning Japanese (2dcloud, 2016) ISBN 1937541169
- I Thought YOU Hated ME (Retrofit Comics, 2016) ISBN 1940398495
- Losing the Girl (Graphic Universe, 2018) ISBN 1541510445
- Gravity's Pull (Graphic Universe, 2018) ISBN 1541545265
- Distant Stars (Graphic Universe, 2020) ISBN 1541587006
- Dirty Produce (Workman Publishing Company, 2021) ISBN 1523513314
- I Thought You Loved Me (Fieldmouse Press, 2023) ISBN 1956636161
