= Yoshiharu Tsuge =

Japanese cartoonist and essayist (1937–2026)

Yoshiharu Tsuge つげ義春
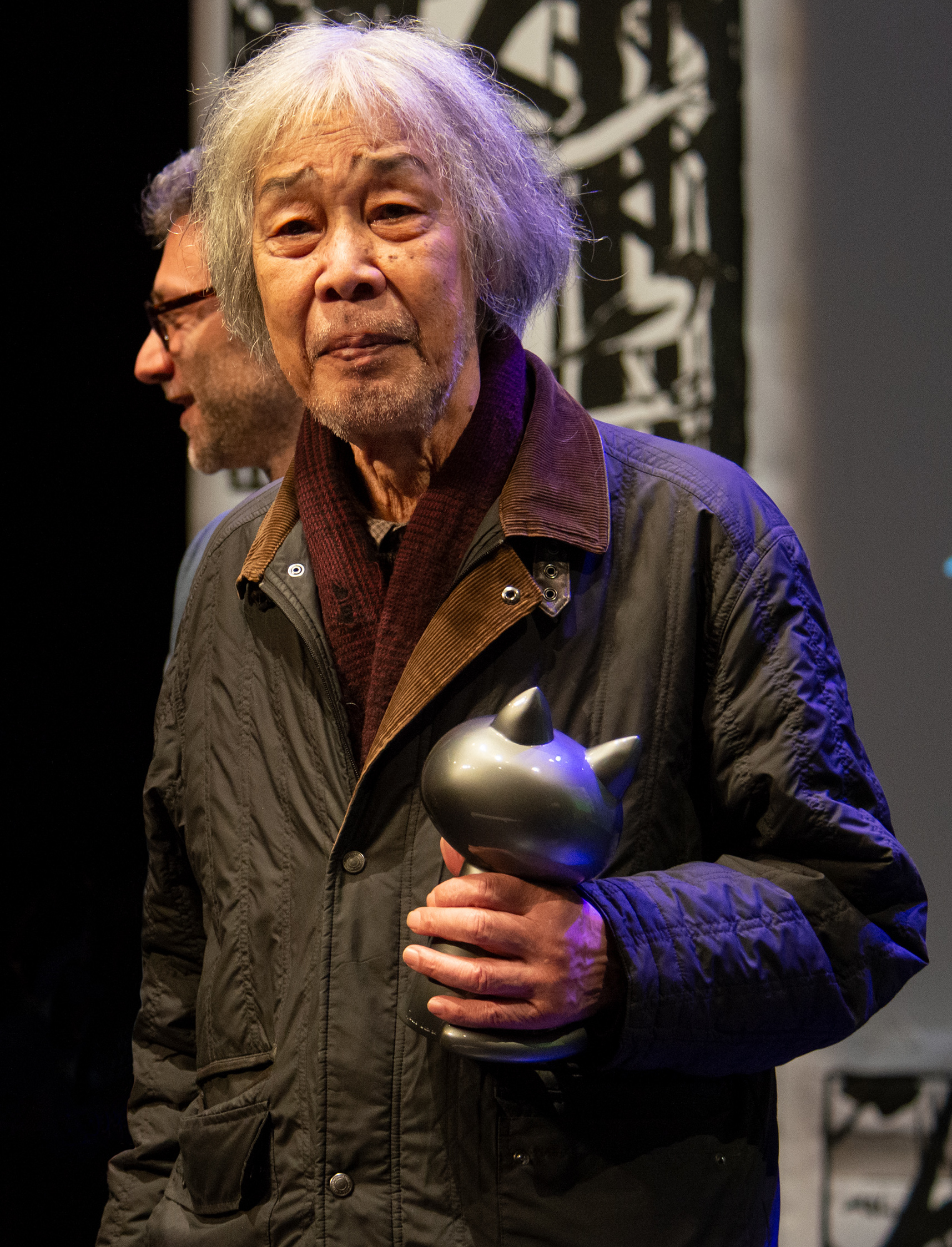
- Tsuge in 2020
- Born: 30 October 1937 Katsushika, Tokyo, Japan
- Died: 3 March 2026 (aged 88) Tokyo, Japan
- Areas: Cartoonist, essayist
- Notable works: The Man Without Talent; Screw Style

Yoshiharu Tsuge (つげ義春, Tsuge Yoshiharu; 30 October 1937 – 3 March 2026) was a Japanese cartoonist and essayist. He was active in comics between 1955 and 1987. His works ranged from tales of ordinary life to dream-like surrealism, and often show his interest in traveling about Japan. Tsuge garnered the most attention from the surrealistic works he published in the late 1960s in the avant-garde magazine Garo.

Tsuge began producing comics in 1955 for the rental comics industry that flourished in impoverished post-War Japan. Initially, he made comics in the hard-boiled gekiga style–dark, realistic tales with negative endings. When rental comics ceased to be viable employment in the mid-1960s, Tsuge was in dire straits until he was picked up by the publishers of the avant garde comics magazine Garo. From 1965 to 1970, he entered his most widely known phase when he produced often surrealistic and introspective works for Garo. The June 1968 issue saw the most famous of these: the dream-based Neji-shiki (most commonly rendered Screw Style in English). Following his success in Garo, Tsuge became withdrawn, and from the 1970s no longer had his works published in that magazine. His works became alternately autobiographical and erotically fantastic, until health and psychological problems drove him from comics after 1987.

He has become a cult figure in Japan. In the West, his status is often compared to that of American cartoonist Robert Crumb. He has had a long-lasting influence, and his works have been adapted to film and television numerous times. His works have rarely been translated–in English, only five short works have appeared. From 1987, he stopped producing comics, and lived a quiet life with his son in Tokyo following his wife's death in 1999, occasionally cooperating with adaptations and reproductions of his past work.

== Life and career ==
Tsuge was born on October 30th, 1937, on the Naka River in Katsushika, Tokyo, Japan. Born into a relatively well-off family, Tsuge was the second son of Ichiro, who was the head chef at Chiyoya Ryokan in Izu Ōshima. Chiyoya Ryokan was the most prestigious inn in Motomachi that served the imperial family, government officials, and prominent artists. After Tsuge's father died from Addison's disease in 1942, two half-sisters, from his mother's second marriage, were introduced to his family. He disliked his stepfather and lived in fear of abuse.

The recession in post-World War II Japan inspired Tsuge to create comics to pitch to pay-libraries' editors. He was intensely shy; writing and illustration allowed him to earn money while avoiding meeting people. He created his first gekiga at 18, showing Osamu Tezuka's influence, who was one of the first mainstream artists to draw gekiga.

=== Early career (1955–1965) ===
Tsuge began his cartooning career contributing to the kashibon rental comics market which flourished in the 1950s. This market targeted a working class audience looking for cheap entertainment, and the cartoonists who fed this market were usually working class themselves. The nihilistic stories, which Tsuge considers hackwork, were done in the gekiga style: dark, realistic comics with mature themes which first developed in Japan in the late 1950s and 1960s.

=== Garo (1965–1970) ===
Tsuge found himself debt-ridden, and would sell blood to raise money. When a girlfriend left him in his early 20s, Tsuge went into depression and attempted suicide. When he had heard about Tsuge's plight, Katsuichi Nagai printed "Yoshiharu Tsuge—please get in touch!" on one of the pages of monthly Garo, the avant-garde comics magazine Nagai had founded in 1964.

In 1966, he published his autobiographical story "Chiko" ("Chiko, the Java sparrow"), depicting his daily life as a struggling manga artist living with a bar hostess making most of their money. It started the movement of Watakushi manga ("I manga", or "comics about me"), also represented by Yu Takita, Tadao Tsuge, and Shinichi Abe. The concept was a borrowed one from watakushi shosetsu (I-novel) tradition in Japanese literature.

Tsuge began contributing to Garo in a style with cartoony figures and realistic backgrounds. The style was similar to that of other contributors to the magazine, such as Sanpei Shirato and Shigeru Mizuki. Tsuge’s stories at the time, however, stood apart by tending towards surrealism and introspection. Screw Style (or Screwceremony) (ねじ式, neji-shiki), Tsuge's most famous work, was published in Garo in 1967. Said to have come from a dream Tsuge had while taking a rooftop nap, the twenty-three page work follows a youth who first appears wading out of the ocean, which seems to reference both the archetype of kamikaze pilots in Japanese war comics and the Japanese folklore concept of the marebito. An artery on the youth’s arm has been severed by a jellyfish, and he desperately hunts for a doctor. Laden with symbolic images of rural poverty, industry and the Pacific War, his journey takes him through a village on a train moving backwards. He faces constant rejection and dismissal of his pain. He finally has his arm mended by a gynecologist who attaches a valve to his severed artery. The work spoke to alienated youth of the era and solidified Tsuge's reputation as a cult personality. It has become one of the key examples of avant-garde Japanese comics.

In February 1968, Tsuge became involved with the avant-garde actress and children's book illustrator Maki Fujiwara. His success at Garo since 1965 meant he was no longer starved for cash, and he claims this made him lazy. After "Mokkiriya no Shōjo" appeared in Garo's August issue that year, no more Tsuge stories appeared until "Yanagiya Shujin" was printed in the February/March issue of Garo in 1970. This was the last of the twenty-two stories that Tsuge contributed to Garo.

=== Post-Garo (1970–1987) ===
Tsuge did not have another story published until 1972. His stories from this point on broke with his Garo style, and tended to be autobiographical or erotic fantasies. Tsuge and Fujiwara were married in 1975, the same year their son was born.

Tsuge was one of a number of cartoonists who found themselves unable to cope with the changes in the industry in the 1970s. The relatively free atmosphere of the 1950s and 1960s transitioned to one in which editors played a larger role, and schedules went from monthly to weekly.

=== Retirement and later life ===
Suffering physically and psychologically, Tsuge ceased making comics after 1987. His last published work of comics was "Parting" (離別, Ribetsu) in June 1987, in which the main character attempts suicide after a relationship breaks up.

Tsuge withdrew into a private life with his family, where they lived by the Tama River in Tokyo. Tsuge lived with his son since his wife's 1999 death from cancer. Despite producing no new works, he cooperated with the filming and reprinting of his works.

=== Personal life and death ===
His birth name is spelled 柘植義春, but he signed his works つげ義春, with identical pronunciation.

Tsuge's brother Tadao Tsuge (つげ忠男, Tsuge Tadao) is also a cartoonist and author of Trash Market and Slum Wolf, the latter published by the New York Review of Books in 2018.

Tsuge died of aspiration pneumonia in Tokyo, on 3 March 2026, at the age of 88.

== Works ==
In 1966, Tsuge suffered from another onset of depression and stopped drawing his own manga to be Shigeru Mizuki's assistant. Under Mizuki's influence, Tsuge's later publications feature highly detailed backgrounds and his trademark cartoonish-characters. Arguably one of Tsuge's more famous works, Screw Style (ねじ式, Neji-Shiki) was published in Garo in 1968. Since the publication of Munō no Hito (無能の人; lit. "The Man without Talent") in 1986, Tsuge has not drawn any more manga. Gilles Laborderie in Indy Magazine notes that Tsuge "tries to create a pace through careful narrative techniques rather than through grand dramatic events" and compares his style to Yoshihiro Tatsumi's.

His work has been collected many times in a variety of formats. In 1993–1994, Chikuma Shōbō published a nine-volume collection of Tsuge's work (including one volume of text) titled Complete Works of Yoshiharu Tsuge (つげ義春全集, Tsuge Yoshiharu Zenshū). In 2008–2009, the same publisher released a nine-volume softcover collection called Yoshiharu Tsuge Collection (つげ義春コレクション, Tsuge Yoshiharu Korekushon).

=== Translations ===
As of 2012, in English, Tsuge's works had rarely been translated. "Red Flowers" was printed in an insert called "Tokyo Raw" in 1985 in Art Spiegelman and Françoise Mouly's Raw magazine (Vol. 1, No. 7). Vol. 2, No. 2 of the same magazine saw "Oba's Electroplate Factory" (大場電気鍍金工業所, Oba Denki Mekki Kōgyōsho) in 1990, translated by Akira Satake and Paul Karasik). Another translation was of Screw Style in The Comics Journal's 250th issue in February 2003, translated by Bill Randall.

Ryan Holmberg translated The Man Without Talent, which was published in 2019 by New York Review Books. Holmberg later translated the following, all published by Drawn and Quarterly: Nejishiki, Oba Electroplating Factory, Red Flowers, and The Swamp.

The Man Without Talent was translated into French as L'Homme sans talent in 2004, and was nominated for best album at the Angoulême International Comics Festival the following year. An English language edition was published by New York Review Comics in 2020. Drawn & Quarterly has announced that, beginning in April 2020, they will publish English translations of his complete works in seven volumes.

In Spanish, Nejishiki, The Man Without Talent, and Tonari no Onna (隣りの女, lit. 'The Woman Next Door') were translated as Nejishiki in 2018, El hombre sin talento in 2015, and La mujer de al lado in 2017 respectively, by Gallo Nero Ediciones.

In Italian, The Man Without Talent was translated as L'uomo senza Talento in 2017 by Canicola.

In Portuguese, The Man Without Talent was translated as O Homem sem Talento in 2019 by the Brazilian publisher Veneta.

In Serbian, Munō no Hito was translated as Čovek bez talenta in 2019. by Besna Kobila.

In Traditional Chinese, Tsuge's several works are translated in two volumes in 2021 as 柘植義春漫畫集 (Collected Comics of Yoshiharu Tsuge), published by Locus Publishing in Taiwan.

In Simplified Chinese, Yoshio no Seishun (義男の青春, lit. 'Yoshio's Youth') was translated as 义男的青春 in 2021 by Special Comix in China.

== Style ==
Tsuge's works have generally been divided into pre-Garo, Garo, and post-Garo phases. In his pre-Garo phase, Tsuge has been included among those considered to have made gekiga—dark, realistic comics with mature themes which first developed in Japan in the late 1950s and 1960s.

== Honours ==
Throughout his career, Tsuge received several notable honours, including the Japan Cartoonists Association Award in 2017, Special Honorary Award at the Angoulême International Comics Festival in 2020, and Order of the Rising Sun in 2024.

== Reception and legacy ==
Tsuge has had an influence on a large number of Japanese cartoonists. Kazuichi Hanawa began producing horror comics for Garo in the early 1970s under the influence of Tsuge's surrealistic comics of the late 1960s. Iou Kuroda called Tsuge his primary influence.

=== Adaptations ===
There have been five film adaptations of Tsuge's works, as well as nine adaptations for television.

Director Teruo Ishii has made film adaptations of Tsuge's work twice. (Note: An adaptation of Tsuge's brother Tadao's "Villain Field" (or "Vagabond Plain") (無頼平野, Burai Heiya) was also filmed by Ishii in 1995.) "Master of the Gensenkan Inn" (ゲンセンカン主人, Gensenkan Shujin) from 1968 was adapted in 1993, and 1968's "Nejishiki" in 1998 (as Wind-Up Type in English).

In 2025, his short stories A View of the Seaside and Mr. Ben and His Igloo were adapted into the live-action film Two Seasons, Two Strangers by Sho Miyake.
