= Garo (magazine) =

Japanese manga magazine

- June 1974 issue of Garo
- Categories: Alternative manga
- Frequency: Monthly
- First issue: July 1964
- Final issue: December 2002
- Company: Seirindō
- Country: Japan
- Language: Japanese

Garo (Japanese: ガロ) was a monthly manga anthology magazine in Japan, founded by Katsuichi Nagai and published by Seirindō from 1964 until 2002. It was fundamental for the emergence and development of alternative and avant-garde manga.

== History ==
Katsuichi Nagai founded Garo in July 1964 in order to publish the work of gekiga artists who didn't want to work for mainstream manga magazines after the demise of the rental book industry (kashi-hon). The magazine offered artists artistic freedom, but didn't pay them any salaries. Nagai particularly wanted to promote Marxist gekiga artist Sanpei Shirato's work, naming the magazine after one of Shirato's ninja characters. The first series published in Garo was Shirato's drama Kamui; exploring themes of class struggle and anti-authoritarianism around a Burakumin ninja boy with an Ainu name. Nagai originally intended the magazine to be for elementary and middle school children to become educated about antimilitarism and direct democracy, publishing essays against the Vietnam War and the rise of the price of school lunch alongside manga. Eventually it became a hit with college students instead. Garo attracted several influential gekiga artists such as Yoshihiro Tatsumi and Yoshiharu Tsuge, and discovered and promoted many new artists.

From 1965 onwards, and especially from 1967 on, the magazine published more and more manga with unconventional form and themes. At the same time, the magazine abandoned its political education project and, while manga published in the magazine stayed critical of militarism and corporate greed, serializations became increasingly "little committed to social change" according to Ryan Holmberg. Garo's circulation at the peak of its popularity in 1971 was over eighty thousand. The magazine was politically affiliated with the Zengakuren and had a big following among the left-wing student movement.

During the 1970s and 1980s its popularity declined. By the mid-1980s its circulation was barely over twenty thousand, and its demise was rumored to be imminent. Nagai managed to keep it going independently until 1991, when it was bought out by a game software company. Although a new, young president was installed and advertisements for computer games (based on stories featured in Garo) started to run in the magazine, Nagai was kept on board as chairman until his death in 1996.

After being bought out by a new owner, there were allegations of the anthology taking a more commercial path. Eventually authors who were regular to Garo went their own ways and founded other anthologies like AX. Garo ceased publication in 2002.

== Style and themes ==
Over the years, Garo went through many artistic phases, including Shirato's leftist samurai dramas, surreal humour, abstract art and surrealism, erotic-grotesque, and punk.

The magazine's early character was defined not by the grotesque, vulgar, or hyperviolent content often associated with later underground manga anthologies, but by a political and artistic seriousness that drew from Marxist thought, modern Japanese history, and experimental narrative and visual techniques. Important contributors apart from Shirato were Shigeru Mizuki, Yoshiharu Tsuge and Seiichi Hayashi. The early period of the magazine saw manga inspired by "kamishibai paper theatre of the [1940s and 1950s], rental kashihon manga of the late [1950s] and early [1960s], children’s illustrated fiction from the 1930s and [1940s], pre-modern travel literature and Buddhist parables, and Japanese folklore and ghost stories". Ryan Holmberg calls this period traditionalist. Sharon Kinsella writes that the magazine explored "the realm of dreams, collective memories and social psychology" and that its manga were "characterized by obscure and typically nihilistic vignettes about individuals living on the fringes of modern society." She cites Yoshiharu Tsuge's Screw Style as an example.

The magazine was considered too specialist to be clearly identified with one of the four classic manga categorizations shōjo manga, shōnen manga, josei manga, and seinen manga.

== Legacy ==
For much of its existence, Garo was the premiere showcase for "art" manga in Japan. It was popular enough during its heyday to inspire several imitators, including COM, founded by manga legend Osamu Tezuka, Comic Baku, and Comic Are. Because Garo was the artistic center of alternative manga production for decades, alternative manga in Japan are often called Garo-kei (ガロ系), even if they were not published in Garo. The term was first used by manga critic Tomofusa Kure in order to describe Garo's influence on the style of mainstream seinen manga published in magazines like Afternoon and Morning in the 1980s and 1990s.

Garo's influence both within the manga business and in Japanese society as a whole has been considerable. Many manga artists who got their start in Garo went on to do much higher-profile work elsewhere, and several films have been produced based on stories that originally ran in Garo. Contemporary graphic design in Japan owes much to Garo artists, particularly King Terry, Seiichi Hayashi, Yoshikazu Ebisu and Shigeru Tamura. Retrospectives on the magazine have appeared in mainstream non-manga magazines, and in 1994 the Kawasaki city museum had a special exhibit of work by Garo alumni.

== Garo in English ==
In 2008 Drawn & Quarterly published Good-Bye, the third volume of their ongoing edition of the work of Yoshihiro Tatsumi. Some of the comics collected in Good-Bye originally appeared in Garo. In 2010 an English version of the anthology AX was published by Top Shelf Productions under the title AX: alternative manga (edited by Sean Michael Wilson and former Garo editor Mitsuhiro Asakawa). It featured several of the creators who had previously appeared in Garo in its later years and received a high level of praise from critics.

== Artists associated with Garo ==
- Shinichi Abe
- Suzy Amakane
- Nobuyoshi Araki
- Yoshikazu Ebisu
- Usamaru Furuya
- Kazuichi Hanawa
- Ikuko Hatoyama
- Seiichi Hayashi
- Hideshi Hino
- Yuji Kamosawa
- Susumu Katsumata
- King Terry
- Yōko Kondō
- Suehiro Maruo
- Hiroshi Masumura
- Shigeru Mizuki
- Shinji Nagashima
- Kiriko Nananan
- Nekojiru
- Takashi Nemoto
- Kyoko Okazaki
- Shoichi Sakurai
- Erica Sakurazawa
- Carol Shimoda
- Sanpei Shirato
- Hinako Sugiura
- Oji Suzuki
- Shigeru Tamura
- Yoshihiro Tatsumi
- Tadao Tsuge
- Yūko Tsuno
- Kuniko Tsurita
- Yoshiharu Tsuge
- Shungicu Uchida
- Muddy Wehara
- Hanako Yamada
- Murasaki Yamada

== Published manga ==
- Kamui by Sanpei Shirato (1964–1971)
- Kitarō Yawa by Shigeru Mizuki (1967–1969)
- Nejishiki by Yoshiharu Tsuge (1968)
- Trash Market by Tadao Tsuge (1968–1972)
- Red Colored Elegy by Seiichi Hayashi (1970–1971)
- "The Hole", "Forked Road", and "Occupied" by Yoshihiro Tatsumi (1970s)
- Good-Bye by Yoshihiro Tatsumi (1971–1972)
- A Single Match by Oji Suzuki
- Talk to My Back by Murasaki Yamada (1981–1984)
- Shōjo Tsubaki by Suehiro Maruo (1983–1984)
- Minami-kun no Koibito by Shungicu Uchida (1986–1987)

== Literature ==
- Dreamland Japan: Writings on Modern Manga by Frederik L. Schodt (ISBN 1-880656-23-X)
- Introduction to Comics Underground Japan, edited by Kevin Quigley (ISBN 0-922233-16-0)
- Garo Manga: The First Decade, 1964–1973, by Ryan Holmberg (The Center for Book Arts, 2010)
