= Eisner Award for Best Archival Collection/Project—Comic Books =

American comic book award

Eisner Award for Best Archival Collection/Project–Comic Books
- Awarded for: Best Archival Collection/Project–Comic Books
- Country: United States
- First award: 2006
- Most recent winner: Akira Hardcover Collection, vols. 1-5
- Website: www.comic-con.org/awards/eisner-awards/

The Eisner Award for Best Archival Collection/Project–Comic Books is an award for "creative achievement" in American comic books. It has been given out every year since 2006. From 1993 to 2005 an award called Best Archival Collection/Project was awarded between, at which point it was split into two awards, one for comic strips and the other for comic books. To be eligible, the original comics must be at least 20-years old.

== Winners and nominees ==
Year	Title	Creators	Editors (Note: No editors were listed until 2010.)	Ref.
2000s
2006	Absolute Watchmen (DC Comics)	Alan Moore and Dave Gibbons		
2006	Buddha, vols. 5-8 (Vertical)	Osamu Tezuka		
2006	The Contract with God Trilogy (W. W. Norton & Company)	Will Eisner		
2006	DC Comics Rarities Archives, vol. 1 (DC Comics)	various		
2006	Fantastic Four Omnibus (Marvel Comics)	Stan Lee and Jack Kirby		
2007	Absolute Sandman, vol. 1 (Vertigo Comics/DC Comics)	Neil Gaiman and various		
2007	Abandon the Old in Tokyo (Drawn & Quarterly)	Yoshihiro Tatsumi		
2007	Art Out of Time: Unknown Comics Visionaries, 1900-1969 (Abrams ComicArts)	Dan Nadel		
2007	The Eternals (Marvel Comics)	Jack Kirby		
2007	Ode to Kirihito (Vertical)	Osamu Tezuka		
2008	I Shall Destroy All the Civilized Planets! (Fantagraphics)	Fletcher Hanks		
2008	Amazing Spider-Man Omnibus, vol. 1 (Marvel Comics)	Stan Lee and Steve Ditko		
2008	Apollo's Song (Vertical)	Osamu Tezuka		
2008	The Completely MAD Don Martin (Running Press)	Don Martin		
2008	Daredevil Omnibus (Marvel Comics)	Frank Miller and Klaus Janson		
2009	Creepy Archives (Dark Horse Comics)	various		
2009	Breakdowns: Portrait of the Artist as a Young %@&*! (Pantheon Books)	Art Spiegelman		
2009	Elektra Omnibus (Marvel Comics)	Frank Miller and Bill Sienkiewicz		
2009	Good-Bye (Drawn & Quarterly)	Yoshihiro Tatsumi		
2009	Herbie Archives (Dark Horse Comics)	Shane O’Shea (Richard E. Hughes) and Ogden Whitney		
2010s
2010	The Rocketeer: The Complete Adventures deluxe edition (IDW Publishing)	Dave Stevens	Scott Dunbier	
2010	The Best of Simon & Kirby (Titan Books)	Joe Simon and Jack Kirby	Steve Saffel	
2010	Blazing Combat (Fantagraphics)	Archie Goodwin et al.	Gary Groth	
2010	Humbug (Fantagraphics)	Harvey Kurtzman et al.	Gary Groth	
2010	The TOON Treasury of Classic Children’s Comics (Abrams ComicArts/Toon Books)	various	Art Spiegelman and Françoise Mouly	
2011	Dave Stevens’ The Rocketeer Artist’s Edition (IDW Publishing)	Dave Stevens	Scott Dunbier	
2011	The Horror! The Horror! Comic Books the Government Didn’t Want You to Read! (Abrams ComicArts)	various	Jim Trombetta	
2011	The Incal Classic Collection (Humanoids Publishing)	Alejandro Jodorowsky and Mœbius		
2011	Lynd Ward: Six Novels in Woodcuts (The Library of America)	Lynd Ward	Art Spiegelman	
2011	Thirteen (Going on Eighteen) (Drawn & Quarterly)	John Stanley		
2012	Walt Simonson's The Mighty Thor Artist's Edition (IDW Publishing)	Walt Simonson		
2012	Government Issue: Comics for the People: 1940s-2000s (Abrams ComicArts)	various	Richard L. Graham	
2012	The MAD Fold-In Collection (Chronicle Books)	Al Jaffee		
2012	PS Magazine: The Best of Preventive Maintenance Monthly (Abrams ComicArts)	Will Eisner		
2012	The Sugar and Spike Archives, vol. 1 (DC Comics)	Sheldon Mayer		
2013	David Mazzucchelli's Daredevil Born Again: Artist's Edition (IDW Publishing)	David Mazzucchelli	Scott Dunbier	
2013	Crime Does Not Pay Archives (Dark Horse Comics)	various	Philip Simon and Kitchen, Lind, & Associates	
2013	Wally Wood's EC Stories: Artist's Edition (IDW Publishing)	Wally Wood	Scott Dunbier	
2013	Walt Disney's Uncle Scrooge: Only a Poor Old Man (Fantagraphics)	Carl Barks	Gary Groth	
2013	Young Romance: The Best of Simon & Kirby's Romance Comics (Fantagraphics)	Joe Simon and Jack Kirby	Michel Gagné	
2014	Will Eisner’s The Spirit Artist’s Edition (IDW Publishing)	Will Eisner	Scott Dunbier	
2014	Best of EC Artist’s Edition (IDW Publishing)	various	Scott Dunbier	
2014	Canteen Kate (Canton Street Press)	Matt Baker		
2014	In the Days of the Mob (DC Comics)	Jack Kirby		
2014	MAD Artist’s Edition (IDW Publishing)	various	Scott Dunbier	
2015	Steranko Nick Fury Agent of S.H.I.E.L.D. Artist’s Edition (IDW Publishing)	Jim Steranko	Scott Dunbier	
2015	The Complete ZAP Comix Box Set (Fantagraphics)	various	Gary Groth with Mike Catron	
2015	Walt Disney’s Donald Duck: Trail of the Unicorn (Fantagraphics)	Carl Barks	Gary Groth	
2015	Walt Disney’s Uncle Scrooge and Donald Duck: The Son of the Son (Fantagraphics)	Don Rosa	David Gerstein	
2015	Walt Kelly’s Pogo: The Complete Dell Comics, vols. 1–2 (Hermes Press)	various	Daniel Herman	
2015	witzend (Fantagraphics)	Wallace Wood et al.	Gary Groth with Mike Catron	
2016	Walt Kelly’s Fairy Tales (IDW Publishing)	Walt Kelly	Craig Yoe	
2016	Frank Miller’s Ronin Gallery Edition (Graphitti Designs/DC Comics)	Frank Miller	Bob Chapman	
2016	P. Craig Russell’s Murder Mystery and Other Stories Gallery Edition (Dark Horse Comics)	P. Craig Russell	Daniel Chabon	
2016	The Puma Blues: The Complete Saga (Dover Publications)	Stephen Murphy, Alan Moore, Michael Zulli, Stephen R. Bissette, and Dave Sim	Drew Ford	
2016	Walt Disney’s Uncle Scrooge and Donald Duck: The Don Rosa Library, vols. 3–4 (Fantagraphics)	Don Rosa	David Gerstein	
2017	The Complete Wimmen’s Comix (Fantagraphics)	various	Trina Robbins	
2017	The Complete Neat Stuff (Fantagraphics)	Peter Bagge	Eric Reynolds	
2017	Fables and Funnies (Dark Horse Comics)	Walt Kelly	compiled by David W. Tosh	
2017	Trump: The Complete Collection (Dark Horse Comics)	Harvey Kurtzman et al.	Denis Kitchen and John Lind	
2017	U.S.S. Stevens: The Collected Stories (Dover Publications)	Sam Glanzman	Drew Ford	
2018	Akira 35th Anniversary Edition (Kodansha USA)	Katsuhiro Otomo	Haruko Hashimoto, Ajani Oloye, and Lauren Scanlan	
2018	Behaving MADly (Yoe Books/IDW Publishing)	various	Craig Yoe	
2018	The Collected Neil the Horse (Conundrum Press)	Katherine Collins	Andy Brown	
2018	Fantagraphics Studio Edition: Jaime Hernandez (Fantagraphics)	Jaime Hernández	Gary Groth	
2018	Will Eisner: The Centennial Celebration, 1917-2017 (Kitchen Sink/Dark Horse Comics)		Paul Gravett, Denis Kitchen, and John Lind	
2019	Bill Sienkiewicz’s Mutants and Moon Knights… And Assassins… Artifact Edition (IDW Publishing)	Bill Sienkiewicz	Scott Dunbier	
2019	Action Comics: 80 Years of Superman Deluxe Edition (DC Comics)	various	Paul Levitz	
2019	Dirty Plotte: The Complete Julie Doucet (Drawn & Quarterly)	Julie Doucet		
2019	Madman Quarter Century Shindig (IDW Publishing)	Mike Allred	Chris Ryall	
2019	Terry Moore’s Strangers in Paradise Gallery Edition (Abstract Studio/Graphitti Designs)	Terry Moore	Joseph Melchior and Bob Chapman	
2019	Will Eisner’s A Contract with God: Curator’s Collection (Kitchen Sink/Dark Horse Comics)	Will Eisner	John Lind	
2020s
2020	Stan Sakai’s Usagi Yojimbo: The Complete Grasscutter Artist Select (IDW Publishing)	Stan Sakai	Scott Dunbier	
2020	Alay-Oop (New York Review Comics)	William Gropper		
2020	The Complete Crepax, vol. 5: American Stories (Fantagraphics)	Crepax	Kristy Valenti	
2020	Jack Kirby’s Dingbat Love (TwoMorrows Publishing)	Jack Kirby	John Morrow	
2020	Moonshadow: The Definitive Edition (Dark Horse Comics)	J. M. DeMatteis, Jon J Muth, George Pratt, Kent Williams, and others		
2020	That Miyoko Asagaya Feeling (Black Hook Press)	Shinichi Abe, translation by Ryan Holmberg	Mitsuhiro Asakawa	
2021	The Complete Hate (Fantagraphics)	Peter Bagge	Eric Reynolds	
2021	Art Young’s Inferno (Fantagraphics)	Art Young	Glenn Bray	
2021	Atlas at War! (Dead Reckoning)	various	Michael J. Vassallo	
2021	Corto Maltese: The Ballad of the Salty Sea (EuroComics/IDW Publishing)	Hugo Pratt, translation by Dean Mullaney and Simone Castaldi		
2021	Little Lulu: The Fuzzythingus Poopi (Drawn & Quarterly)	John Stanley	Frank Young and Tom Devlin	
2021	Man and Superman and Other Stories (Fantagraphics)	Harvey Kurtzman	J. Michael Catron	
2022	EC Covers Artist’s Edition (IDW Publishing)	various	Scott Dunbier	
2022	Farewell, Brindavoine (Fantagraphics)	Tardi, translation by Jenna Allen	Conrad Groth	
2022	Marvel Comics Library: Spider-Man, vol. 1: 1962–1964 (Taschen)	Stan Lee and Steve Ditko	Steve Korté	
2022	Spain Rodriguez: My Life and Times, vol. 3 (Fantagraphics)	Spain Rodriguez	Patrick Rosenkranz	
2022	Steranko Nick Fury: Agent of S.H.I.E.L.D. Artisan Edition (IDW Publishing)	Jim Steranko	Scott Dunbier	
2022	Uncle Scrooge: Island in the Sky (Fantagraphics)	Carl Barks	J. Michael Catron	
2023	The Fantastic Worlds of Frank Frazetta (Taschen)	Frank Frazetta	Dian Hansen	
2023	The Deluxe Giménez: The Fourth Power & The Starr Conspiracy (Humanoids Publishing)	Juan Giménez	Alex Donoghue and Bruno Lesigne	
2023	Home to Stay! The Complete Ray Bradbury EC Stories (Fantagraphics)	Ray Bradbury and various	J. Michael Catron	
2023	The Simpsons Treehouse of Horror Ominous Omnibus, vol. 1 (Abrams ComicArts)	various		
2023	Walt Disney’s Uncle Scrooge: The Diamond Jubilee Collection (Fantagraphics)	Carl Barks	David Gerstein	
2024	All-Negro Comics 75th Anniversary Edition (Very GOOD Books)	various	Chris Robinson	
2024	Adventures Into Terror: The Atlas Comics Library, vol. 1 (Fantagraphics)	various	Michael J. Vassallo	
2024	The Ballad of Halo Jones Full Colour Omnibus (2000 AD/Rebellion Publishing)	Alan Moore and Ian Gibson	Olivia Hicks	
2024	The John Severin Westerns Featuring American Eagle (Fantagraphics)	John Severin	Michael Dean	
2024	Michael Golden’s Marvel Stories Artist’s Edition (IDW Publishing)	Michael Golden	Scott Dunbier	
2025	David Mazzucchelli’s Batman: Year One Artist’s Edition (IDW Publishing)	David Mazzucchelli and Frank Miller	Scott Dunbier	
2025	The Complete Web of Horror (Fantagraphics)	various	Dana Marie Andra	
2025	DC Comics Style Guide (Standards Manual)	various		
2025	The Farewell Song of Marcel LaBrume (Fantagraphics)	Attilio Micheluzzi	Gary Groth and Conrad Groth	
2025	Wally Wood from Witzend: Complete Collection (Vanguard Publishing)	Wally Wood	commentary by J. David Spurlock	
2025	X-Men: The Manga Remastered, vol. 1 (Viz Media)	various	Glenn Greenberg and others	
2026	Akira Hardcover Collection, vols. 1-5 (Kodansha USA)	Katsuhiro Otomo	Haruko Hashimoto, Ajani Oloye, and Lauren Scanlan	
2026	The Atlas Comics Library No. 7: Girl Comics (Fantagraphics)	various	Dr. Michael J. Vassallo	
2026	Comics of the Movement Good Trouble Comics (Good Trouble Comics)	Courtland Cox, Jennifer Lawson, Alfred Hassler, and Benton Resnik		
2026	Hothead Paisan (New York Review Comics)	Diane DiMassa	organized by Anika Banister	
2026	Scream! The Specials 1985–2024 (Rebellion Publishing)	various	Chiara Mestieri	
2026	Weird Science XXL, Vol. 1 (Taschen)	various	Grant Geissman	
