= Black Blizzard (manga) =

Japanese manga

- The original cover of Black Blizzard, showing the escaped convicts

黒い吹雪 (Kuroi Fubuki)
- Genre: Crime noir
- Manga
- Written by: Yoshihiro Tatsumi
- Published by: Hinomaru Bunko
- English publisher: NA: Drawn & Quarterly
- Published: November 1956
- Volumes: 1

Black Blizzard (Japanese: 黒い吹雪, Hepburn: Kuroi Fubuki) is a Japanese manga written and illustrated by Yoshihiro Tatsumi and published by Hinomaru Bunko in November 1956. It is about two convicts who are handcuffed together and escape after the train they are being escorted on crashes. Written by Tatsumi in twenty days, it is considered to be one of the first full-length gekiga works.

Black Blizzard was published in North America by Drawn & Quarterly—in the style of a pulp paperback—on April 13, 2010. The manga's opening sequence was included in Tatsumi, an animated film based on the author's works, in 2011. Reception towards the manga has been positive regarding its style, but the crude art caused critics to be mixed. Manga scholar Ryan Holmberg has called Black Blizzard an unsolicited adaptation of Kazuo Shimada's "Black Rainbow".

== Plot ==
Two convicts—pianist Susumu Yamaji, arrested for murder, and card shark Shinpei Konta, a five-time convict—are handcuffed together while being escorted on a train. An avalanche causes the train to derail, trapping their escorting officer, and the two run into the mountains. They find a forest ranger's hut and wait, failing to break the handcuff chain with a rock.

Susumu proceeds to tell the story of how he was arrested for murder: After his orchestra was disbanded, Susumu became depressed, drinking and ceasing to compose music until he met Saeko Ozora, the star singer of a traveling circus, and he started writing songs for her. When it was time for the circus to change locations, Susumu made an offer for her to stay and study music, but he received a letter of rejection. Susumu, drunk and angry, confronted the ringmaster for oppressing her, and when he woke up, found a bloody knife in his hand and the ringmaster dead.

In the mountains, the police find them, so the two hide in a nearby town while evading officers. Left with no choice but to escape the handcuffs, Shinpei proposes a game of chance to decide whose hand would be cut off, and in a doctor's office they choose from a cup laced with sleeping pills. However, Shinpei had put powder in both cups and did not swallow his, amputating his own hand instead. When Susumu wakes up, the officer who arrested him explains that Shinpei was Saeko's father and a member of her circus, and had realized that Susumu was framed by the deputy ringmaster, who ended up confessing. Susumu reunites with Saeko, with new songs for her to sing.

== Production ==
When Tatsumi wrote the manga, he was 21 years old with three years of experience creating seventeen book-length manga and several volumes of short stories for the rental book market. While it would usually take him a month and a half, he created Black Blizzard during a burst of creativity over twenty days, culminating in what he described as a "runner's high". The manga was created during a boom in short story magazines, so Tatsumi tried to come up with new forms of expression such as conveying movement realistically, though his art was rough and used a lot of diagonal lines. Looking at the manga in retrospect, Tatsumi felt nostalgic for his youth, but also felt that the republishing was exposing "something shameful and private" from his past.

According to Tatsumi in a 2009 interview, the inspiration of a prison escape came from Alexandre Dumas' The Count of Monte Cristo, while he got the idea of two prisoners handcuffed together from a story in a pulp fiction magazine. In the autobiographical A Drifting Life, Tatsumi's protagonist Hiroshi reads Dumas' book, as well as a short story by Kazuo Shimada about "two convicts handcuffed together, who escape while being escorted by police." Hiroshi had been staying at a "manga camp" with other Hinomaru Bunko authors in order to work on their monthly collection Shadow (影, Kage), but was yearning to work on a full-length story. He pitched the idea of adapting Dumas' story as a ten-volume Japanese period piece, but his boss did not feel he was skilled enough or had enough time. After his brother Okimasa's hospitalization, he returned home and started work on Black Blizzard, which went smoothly and Tatsumi felt so involved, he shivered while drawing the cold mountain scenes. Inspired by films, Hiroshi had started to strive towards an "anti-manga manga" with works like The Silent Witness; his brother noted that Black Blizzard's pacing was "even more cinematic" than his previous work and remarked: "you can't even call this manga". The manga was well-received by Hiroshi's fellow authors, with Masaki Sato (佐藤まさあき) calling it "the manga of the future".

Manga scholar Ryan Holmberg contends that more than being inspired by a Kazuo Shimada story, Black Blizzard is a direct unauthorized adaptation of Shimada's "Black Rainbow" (黒い虹, Kuroi Niji). The story follows two repatriated war veterans—one who is a pianist framed for murder, and the other a gambler whose family left him—who are handcuffed together and escape after a train crash. While Tatsumi does refer to the story in his autobiographical A Drifting Life, it is not mentioned in his gekiga manifesto Gekiga College (劇画大学, Gekiga Daigaku). Holmberg suspects that Tatsumi included the manga's sources later in his autobiography because Masaki Sato's autobiography mistakenly assumed that it was based on the film The Defiant Ones, which was released two years later in 1958. Holmberg also notes that A Drifting Life was largely based on the history The Tale of Gekiga by Tatsumi's older brother Shōichi Sakurai (桜井昌一), which itself borrows from Tatsumi's earlier Gekiga College. Holmberg discounts the influence of Dumas' The Count of Monte Cristo because of how closely Black Blizzard mirrors "Black Rainbow" in its story. Holmberg says that the narrative of "the manga's genesis, especially in its recent melodramatic versions, simply has to go"; "the godfather of gekiga did not remake the world of manga ex nihilo, nor simply with the help of a couple of 'influences.' The evidence suggests very clearly that Tatsumi had at his side a copy of 'Black Rainbow,' which he was using more or less as a script". Lastly, he notes similarities between the circus singer Saeko Ozora and postwar singer Hibari Misora, concluding that gekiga did not have its roots in the "everyday actualities of postwar Japan and especially its underclass", but rather "mass entertainment and the world of fantasy from magazines and the movies", especially the prepackaged "postwar experience".

== Release ==
The manga was published by Hinomaru Bunko (日の丸文庫) in November 1956. It was reprinted by Seirinkogeisha (青林工藝舎) on January 22, 2010. Drawn & Quarterly licensed and released the manga in North America on April 13, 2010, with cartoonist Adrian Tomine as editor, designer, and letterer. Tomine wanted the Drawn & Quarterly edition's cover to imitate the original's lettering as well for it to resemble a pulp paperback. It was also published in Italy by BAO Publishing. The opening color sequence from the manga was animated in Tatsumi, the film adaptation of Tatsumi's A Drifting Life, in 2011.

== Reception ==
Critics received Black Blizzard's portrayal positively, while the unrefined art was seen ambivalently. Joseph Luster of Otaku USA noted that the story is typical for its time, but said that this "is overshadowed by its bold, filmic execution" as well as its insight into Tatsumi's early career. Katherine Dacey of Manga Bookshelf found the art's anatomy lacking, but complimented its characterization and composition, concluding that the manga has "a vital, improvisatory energy missing from Tatsumi's later period". Greg McElhatton of Read About Comics liked the manga's tense situations, but felt that the second half was slow with a weak ending, and said that Tatsumi's art is "blocky and crude in places, but there's an energy about it that helps propel those early pages forward." Connie C. of Comic Book Resources described it as a "very straightforward crime story, [that] is well told, but doesn't get much more elaborate", but called it a "beautiful example" of a pulp short story.

Tom Spurgeon called the manga "a fun but rough work, full of character types and situations entirely too on the nose to reflect the nuances of certain moral questions brought to bear", especially disliking the ending and saying of the art: "the best scenes in Black Blizzard have a physical immediacy that only arises from fundamentally solid cartooning with a corresponding attention to movement". Publishers Weekly called the story and layouts simple, and the art sometimes crude, but "with a cinematic use of perspective, intensified via the characters and their circumstances, Tatsumi constructs a thrilling narrative with emotional depth." Michelle Smith of Comic Book Resources said that the manga is "a quick and fun hard-boiled adventure yarn", feeling that Susumu's story was "silly" and Shinpei's connection "too convenient", but complimenting the "fast-paced narrative" and finding the rough art to suit the characters.

The A.V. Club described Black Blizzard as a "head-spinning blur of hardboiled suspense", likening the climax to Mickey Spillane's work, and calling Tatsumi's early art "necessarily loose and frantic". Shawn O'Rourke of PopMatters compared the story's nervous tension to EC Comics stories and said that the art "while simplistic, conveys a depth and nuance that engages the reader", adding that "unwieldy exposition or narrative declarations" are avoided, and that the manga "is still eminently enjoyable in a way that so many of dated classics of that era are not." ICv2 said that "Tatsumi skillfully uses the conventions of the crime story to examine his characters who come from very different social backgrounds", calling Black Blizzard "one of the first examples of the realistic, socially conscious, and adult (in the best sense of the term) gekiga genre of manga." Deb Aoki of About.com said of the manga: "while not as polished as his later works, this one-shot crackles with youthful energy, cinematic style, and Tatsumi's burning desire to push the boundaries of manga beyond kids stuff."

== Legacy ==
Black Blizzard has been called one of the first full-length gekiga works. Tatsumi would come to view the manga as the epitome of the new genre of gekiga. Kōji Asaoka (旭丘光志), a gekiga author, later told Tatsumi that when he read the manga as a middle school student, he was really impressed, braving the snow to show it to his friend, who he talked with "about the appearance of a new type of manga the whole night".
