= The Push Man and Other Stories =

Short story manga collection

- The cover of the paperback edition of The Push Man and Other Stories
- Genre: Slice of life
- Manga
- Written by: Yoshihiro Tatsumi
- English publisher: Drawn & Quarterly
- Magazine: Gekiga Young
- Published: September 1, 2005
- Volumes: 1

The Push Man and Other Stories is a collection of gekiga short stories by manga artist Yoshihiro Tatsumi. It collects sixteen stories by Tatsumi which were serialized in the manga magazine Gekiga Young as well as in self-published dōjinshi magazines in 1969. Drawn & Quarterly collected the stories and published them on September 1, 2005. In 2006, the manga was nominated for the Ignatz Award for Outstanding Anthology or Collection and the Harvey Award for Best American Edition of Foreign Material.

== Plot ==
"Piranha" (人喰魚, Hitokui Sakai)
A worker who cuts sheet metal in a plant loses his arm so that his spouse can use the million-yen payout to open her own club. Spending his days idly, he purchases a tank of piranhas. One day, after spotting her outside a hotel with another man and getting criticized by her, he submerges her wrist in the tank and she is bitten. She leaves him and he returns to work at another sheet metal plant.
"Projectionist"
A traveling projectionist of pornographic films is sent to the countryside by his employer. On his return, he sees lewd graffiti in the bathroom and this revitalizes his libido.
"Black Smoke" (焼却炉, Shōkyaku)
An infertile incinerator operator burns the aborted fetus of his unfaithful wife. When she leaves the clothes iron on while falling asleep, he leaves and watches their house burn from a hill.
"The Burden" (余計者, Yokeimono)
A sign holder has sex with a homeless prostitute, later advising her to stand knee-deep in water to abort her child. When his pregnant wife enters labor, he strangles her to death, but the baby is born. When he comes back in six months, he is arrested and sees the prostitute carrying a baby.
"Test Tube" (試験管, Shikenkan)
Koike, a sperm donor, becomes infatuated with the recipient of his sperm. When it fails to make her pregnant, she requests a different donor. He becomes obsessed, attempts to rape her, and is subsequently thrown into jail, confused as to why he took that course of action.
"Pimp"
Tetsuji, a husband of a prostitute, lives listlessly, spending his time playing slots or getting into fights. He decides to move to the countryside with a noodle shop employee.
"The Push Man" (押し屋, Oshi-ya)
Kizaki, a push man, helps a woman after her shirt rips. She has sex with him, and later brings him to a "date", where instead two of her friends rape him. The next day, while attempting to push during a particularly chaotic rush hour, he is pushed inside the train himself. He yells to be let off, but slowly relaxes.
"Sewer" (下水道, Gesuidō)
A sewer cleaner stumbles upon an aborted fetus, which his coworker strips a cross from before disposing of. When his girlfriend's pregnancy starts to show, he helps her get an abortion. The next day when he disposes of it at work, his coworker finds it and laments the lack of jewelry before throwing it away.
"Telescope" (望遠鏡, Bōenkyō)
A disabled man spends his time on the rooftop of a department store. One day he looks through a telescope just used by an older man and watches a nude woman. The older man later tries to have sex with the woman but is unable to consummate. He requests the disabled man to watch him again and is able to perform anew. The disabled man commits suicide by jumping off of the roof.
"The Killer" (殺し屋, Koroshi-ya)
Tamiya gets an adverse reaction after seeing a personal in a newspaper requesting that he contact someone, tying his wife up and throwing up on her. After observing people from Tokyo Tower and watching a documentary about Hitler, he calls the person and receives a job to kill someone. He shoots a woman driving a car and receives payment in a coin locker. Before he returns home with gifts, his wife thanks his employer on the phone for giving him contract killings.
"Traffic Accident" (事故死, Jikoshi)
Shibata, an auto mechanic, stays up to watch the hostess of a late night show and grows in love with her. One day she drops off her car at his shop and leaves with a man. After finding her panties in the backseat, Shibata rigs the car so it crashes. The hostess' death is announced as he breathes in carbon monoxide after taking Brovarin pills.
"Make-Up"
A cross-dressing man who lives with a cocktail waitress rejects his coworker. He meets a woman at a café while disguised and the two start going out. The waitress remarks to him that he seems "more alive".
"Disinfection" (消毒, Shōdoku)
A disinfector works on the side as a secretary for three call girls. While disinfecting, he receives a call, but the caller hangs up. While walking on the sidewalk, a payphone rings, but the caller also hangs up. He calls one of the business cards which propositions a date and pays a pimp. He discovers that the women is one of the call girls called Naomi who he had a crush on. Instead of having sex with her, he opens his disinfecting bag, causing her to leave. He receives a call for Naomi and cleans the handset instead.
"Who Are You?" (あんた誰や？, Anta Dare ya?)
Matsuda, an ex-convict working at an automobile parts plant, has a boss who dislikes him and made one of his workers pregnant. When Matsuda's wife lies to him that she will be going to visit her home, he puts his pet scorpion in her bag, killing her and a company president. When he goes on a date with the coworker and she tells him she will abort the baby, he embraces her. Remembering his attempt to get inside an American military base to steal a gun, he constantly repeats to himself the questions the soldier asked him: "Who are you? What are you doing here?" He plans to kill his boss with a knife, but loses his nerve, instead having an identity crisis.
"Bedridden"
Fukuda, a seal authenticator, is bedridden by a car accident. Because of this, he offers his coworker Tanno 300,000 yen to take care of the girl in his apartment. When Tanno discovers that she is a sex slave immobilized due to foot binding, he suffocates Fukuda to become her ninth master.
"My Hitler" (おれのヒットラー, Ore no Hittorā)
Shoji lives with a bar hostess, wondering what it would be like to have a child with her and whether the child would grow up as a Napoleon or Hitler. Their apartment is frequented by a large rat, but he finds himself unable to kill it because it is pregnant. This causes the hostess to stay at her friend's place. When Shoji visits her bar, he tells her that none of the rat's six babies came out like Hitler, and leaves her.

== Production ==
While writing the stories in the collection, Tatsumi was running a publishing house for manga rental shops so he did not have time to work on his own manga. At the same time, manga rental shops were declining in favor of manga magazines. According to Tatsumi in a 2004 interview, because he felt like an outcast in the manga industry, he wanted to sincerely portray the working class around him in slice of life portraits. He was also influenced by police reports and human interest stories in newspapers. When he was given an assignment, he would choose three stories from twenty of his ideas and show the layouts for his editor to choose one. He would draw the actual stories without assistants using Kent paper and calligraphic pens.

In a 2007 interview, Tasumi described Gekiga Young—the magazine his works were being serialized in—as an erotic "third-rate magazine" with low pay, which gave him freedom with the types of work he could create. Because the other stories in Gekiga Young were sexual with passive women, Tatsumi decided to take the opposite approach with his stories to interest readers. At the time he was also feeling "anxiety and fear of women" which influenced their depiction. He also did not feel that the aggressive men in the other stories reflected reality so his own male characters were able to be weak or passive. Because of his low page count and the resulting need for many panels, Tatsumi's editor suggested that he forgo speech bubbles to help focus on the art, which led to his silent protagonists. Tatsumi's editor had a good understanding of comics and got along well with Tatsumi, so when the magazine wanted to stop running his work, the editor quit as well because he only worked there due to Tatsumi's work.

== Release ==
The shorter stories in the collection were published in a bi-weekly manga magazine Gekiga Young (劇画ヤング, Gekiga Yangu) in 1969. Tatsumi was only given eight pages to work with because he did not have a reputation in magazines for young men. "My Hitler" and "Who Are You?" were afforded more pages because they were self-published in dōjinshi magazines.

Drawn & Quarterly collected the stories, with Adrian Tomine as editor and designer, and published the manga on September 1, 2005. Tomine, an American cartoonist, had first read Tatsumi's work in Good-bye and other stories—an unauthorized translation by Catalan Communications published in 1987 (Note: Good-bye and other stories includes many of the titles in The Push Man and other stories and is distinct from Drawn & Quarterly's third Tatsumi collection titled Good-Bye.)—at the age of 14. Tomine had started losing interest in comics and tried to delve in alternative comics, finding that the manga, along with other works, reignited his passion for them. Tomine had been attempting to get Tatsumi's work translated for a long time, a "surprisingly troubled and complicated process", and finalized the arrangements for The Push Man and Other Stories in a meeting with Tatsumi in 2003. Because Tatsumi was so prolific, Drawn & Quarterly planned to publish a representative sample of Tatsumi's work from each year, starting at 1969 at his request.

== Themes ==
Tom Gill of the Hooded Utilitarian felt that the story "Sewer" was depicting an alienating society, especially with the non-expressive characters who repress themselves and their problems to "survive in the darker backwaters of modern industrial society". The protagonist screaming at the disco indicated an "emotional breaking-point". The two frames where it seems the characters would show concern for the aborted fetus are part of a "nihilistic theatre of cruelty". Gill also says that "Sewer" was likely inspired by Yoshiharu Tsuge's earlier story "Sanshōuo" (山椒魚; "Salamander"), with both artists being serialized in Garo. The combination of a fetus and the sewer would also appear in "My Hitler" and a six-volume epic titled Jigoku no Gundan (地獄の軍団; "Army Corps of Hell"), indicating "intense obsessions" by Tatsumi. Other stories in the collection that focus on childbirth include "Black Smoke", "The Burden", and "Test Tube", which have in common Tatsumi's themes of sexual humiliation, economic inadequacy, and disgust related to reproduction.

== Reception ==
Carlo Santos of Anime News Network felt that the dead baby trope and pushover protagonists were overused by Tatsumi to elicit emotion. He also criticized Drawn & Quarterly's choice to flip the art. Santos concludes that "although the stories hammer the same point over and over again, and seemingly with the same character each time, their brutal honesty and stark settings will be a refreshing change for readers who wonder whatever happened to the diversity of the [manga] artform." Tim O'Neil of PopMatters noted the dark and misanthropic themes in the stories, but said that Tatsumi distinguishes himself with the longer stories, especially "Who Are You", because of their "narrative lyricism" and "subjectivity". Grant Goodman of Comics Village felt that Tatsumi's characters were portrayed through his art rather than dialogue, saying of his stories: "I cannot call any of them particularly excellent, but I do think that Tatsumi's style is refreshing and a welcome alternative to the style of current manga best-sellers." Ng Suat Tong of the Hooded Utilitarian criticized the art, describing it as "crude, inexperienced and laid down with the kind of haste which begets mistakes" as well as the predictable misogyny in the stories and their linear structure, especially disliking "Telescope". Daryl Surat of the Anime World Order podcast felt that the stories in the manga were a product of postwar Japan and difficult to identify with in a modern context, adding that the although the stories are similar, they are more concentrated due to their short length. In a starred review, Publishers Weekly compared the tone of the stories as "between contemporary short fiction and EC Comics' old 'shock' comics", noting the theme of social maladjustment and complimenting Tatsumi's "evocative settings" and the flow of his stories. Andrew D. Arnold of Time complimented the naturalism of the stories and art, but disliked the misogyny present in the men's relationships, concluding that the collection "feels as fresh and revelatory as when the works of Japanese cinema first began arriving in the U.S." R.C. Baker of The Village Voice said that the manga's expressive art helped speak for its silent characters and that the subject matter distinguished itself from modern Japanese popular culture: "A fearless spelunker of the id, Tatsumi delves beneath the button-down uniformity of Japan's legions of office drones." Tom Rosin of Manga Life was reminded of kitchen sink films by the stories and called Tatsumi a "master of the short story", saying that the manga "is so unlike the Japanese comics we're accustomed to now, and such a strong example of his early work I find it slightly terrifying that this book only contains selections of his best comics from 1969!" David Cozy of the Asahi Herald Tribune felt that manga was distinguished from literature with the eight-page limit—which forced Tatsumi to distill his stories and was appropriate for representing his "characters' constricted lives"—as well as with the identifiable "everyman" in his art.

The manga was nominated for the 2006 Ignatz Award for Outstanding Anthology or Collection. It was also nominated for the 2006 Harvey Award for Best American Edition of Foreign Material. Time listed the manga, along with Tatsumi's Abandon the Old in Tokyo, as second place in its Top 10 Comics of 2006.
