= Good-Bye (manga) =

Short story manga collection

- The cover of the paperback edition of Good-Bye, showing a panel from the titular story
- Manga
- Written by: Yoshihiro Tatsumi
- English publisher: Drawn & Quarterly
- Published: June 1, 2008
- Volumes: 1

Good-Bye is a collection of gekiga short stories by manga artist Yoshihiro Tatsumi. It collects nine stories by Tatsumi from 1971 to 1972. Drawn & Quarterly published the manga in North America on June 1, 2008, with Adrian Tomine as editor and designer. The manga was nominated for the 2009 Eisner Award for Best Archival Collection/Project—Comic Books.

== Plot ==
"Hell" (地獄, Jigoku)
During a visit by Prime Minister Eisaku Satō to the 25th Hiroshima Peace Memorial, Koyanagi, a photographer, recalls the assignment he was sent on after the atomic bombing of Hiroshima and the photograph he took of a son massaging his mother's back. After the Treaty of San Francisco, he had sold the photograph to a newspaper and it became famous as a symbol against nuclear proliferation. After more was discovered of the family, a sculpture was made of the photograph and Koyanagi was tasked to lead a global "No More Hiroshima" campaign using the sculpture. Before the statue was unveiled, a man accosted him claiming to be Kiyoshi Yamada, the son in the picture, and revealed that the shadow is actually of his friend murdering his mother so that he could sell their house. Yamada blackmailed Koyanagi to raise money for his lung disease, but Koyanagi murdered him instead and found out that the campaign was cancelled after Yamada visited the newspaper. Koyanagi was living in his own personal hell ever since, comparing it to the devastation of Hiroshima itself.
"Just a Man" (男 一発, Otoko Ippatsu)
Saburo Hanyama, a salaryman, is due to retire but does not relish spending time with his wife, whom he loathes. After visiting Yasukuni Shrine, he decides to spend his retirement package on committing adultery and betting on horse races in order to spite his wife. However, he finds neither fulfilling. When Okawa, an office lady at his job, asks him to dinner after she was dumped, he finds he cannot consummate. Hanyama returns to the shrine, resolved to keep living, and urinates on a cannon.
"Sky Burial" (鳥葬, Chōsō)
Nogawa suspects that he is being followed by vultures. Scared, he secludes himself, dropping out of college and breaking up with his girlfriend. When it is discovered that his neighbor had been dead for three months, his friend and other neighbors move out. However, with nowhere to go, Nogawa stays as the building succumbs to nature and a group of vultures roost on the roof.
"Rash"
A sixty-year old retired salaryman lives alone in a hut alongside a river. He develops a recurring rash which he discovers to be psychosomatic. One day he discovers a woman who had tried to commit suicide and she stays with him to cook. The man learns how to control the rash as well as his erection. Feeling reinvigorated, he leaves a phallic mushroom in the woman's bed at night.
"Woman in the Mirror" (鏡の中の女, Kagami no Naka no Onna)
On a business trip to his hometown, Tetsuji reminisces on a childhood incident involving Kazuya Ikeuchi, an effeminate boy who liked to cross-dress. Ikeuchi lived in a household with four sisters, and because he was the only male after his father's death, his family would pressure him to succeed. After Ikeuchi did not go to school for three days, Tetsuji visited him and found him dressed as a woman. Later that day a fire erupted in Ikeuchi's house and killed his mother. While waiting for the bus, Tetsuji spots Ikeuchi with a wife and child.
"Night Falls Again" (夜がまたくる, Yoru ga Mata Kuru)
A factory worker, who moved from a farm to Osaka, spends his time watching stripteases and gazing at women in the streets. He feels alone and his boss declines his request to learn how to drive.
"Life is So Sad"
Akemi, a bar hostess, waits patiently for four years for her husband to get out of jail, fending off advances from customers and visiting him regularly. However, he does not trust her and the waiting is tough on her. On the night before his release, she invites a customer to her room and requests that he have sex with her on the same sheets she lost her virginity on.
"Click Click Click" (コツコツコツ, Kotsu Kotsu Kotsu)
Yasuke Yamano is a man who succeeded at the stock market and spends his time doing volunteer work. Yamano also has a shoe fetish and wants to have a meaningful death, dreaming of dying in ecstasy in a stampede.
"Good-bye" (グッドバイ, Guddobai)
Mariko is a prostitute servicing American soldiers at the end of World War II. She falls in love with one named Joe and is visited by her father for money. However, after Joe returns home to his wife and kids, Mariko binge drinks. When her father visits her, she has sex with him. Shortly after, she is with another soldier.

== Production and release ==
The stories in the manga were written between 1971 and 1972, as Tatsumi transitioned from rental comics to publishing in magazines. "Hell" was published in the Japanese Playboy, which surprised Tatsumi because publishers would not publish that kind of subject matter at the time. The stories were created without assistants. When he started writing for magazines, Tatsumi started to tackle social issues and the editors gave him complete creative freedom. Due to the political atmosphere at the time, Tatsumi felt disillusioned by Japan's fascination with its economic growth. "Hell" was inspired by a photograph Tatsumi saw of a shadow burnt into a wall by radiation heat of the nuclear bomb. Tatsumi also grew up in Osaka near a military base called Itami Airfield, which influenced his perception of American soldiers and their portrayal in "Good-Bye".

Drawn & Quarterly published the manga in North America on June 1, 2008. It was edited and designed by Adrian Tomine. In an interview with Newsarama, Tomine described the process of creating the book as a collaborative one between the publisher, Tatsumi, and Tatsumi's representative. Tomine himself had to make panel-by-panel decisions on the translation of sound effects and whether a panel should be mirrored. For the design of the book, his goal was to "arrive at a design which is attractive and eye-catching, but also one in which the emphasis is placed squarely on Mr. Tatsumi's work."

== Reception ==
Jeremy Estes of PopMatters called Tatsumi's imagination "dark and disturbing, but definitely worth the trip." Esters added that Tatsumi's utilitarian art style and clean style of storytelling make the manga easy to follow visually, but its tone of despair can be overwhelming. Bill Randall of The Comics Journal described the manga's stories "as subtle as pissing in someone's face", but acknowledged Tatsumi's place in manga history and the strength of his images. In a starred review, Publishers Weekly observed that Tatsumi tackles difficult subjects, but instead of exploiting, he humanizes his characters. It also called his art masterful in how he varies his style and depicts "graceful motion, grisly suffering and complicated emotion." Gordon Flagg of Booklist noted that the stories in the manga are more political than usual for Tatsumi in their portrayal of postwar Japan, saying of the manga: "Tatsumi's mastery of the visual simplicity of classic manga gives a stark power to these devastating, uncompromising pieces." Richard Rayner of the Los Angeles Times described the stories as "remarkable, amazing" saying that their style is "spare, elliptical and it's sometimes necessary to read two or three times to appreciate the full nightmarish power." Andrew Wheeler of ComicMix preferred the stories translated in Abandon the Old in Tokyo, but still found the stories "Hell" and the titular work to be comparable, calling the manga "a stunning achievement, a collection of dark, realistic stories from a side of the world we rarely see." Calling the manga bleak, Tom Baker of The Daily Yomiuri said that "there's no point in reading such depressing stuff unless it is done very well. And Tatsumi does it excellently."

The manga was nominated for the 2009 Eisner Award for Best Archival Collection/Project—Comic Books.
