= On Their Frontlines: The Lives of Japanese War Brides =

Japanese manga series

- First tankōbon volume cover

線場のひと (Senjō no Hito)
- Genre: Historical
- Manga
- Written by: Marina Lisa Komiya
- Published by: Leed Publishing
- English publisher: NA: Fantagraphics
- Imprint: Torch Comics
- Magazine: Torch Web
- Original run: April 21, 2023 – January 30, 2025
- Volumes: 2

On Their Frontlines: The Lives of Japanese War Brides (線場のひと, Senjō no Hito) is a Japanese manga series written and illustrated by Marina Lisa Komiya. It was serialized on Leed Publishing's Torch Web manga website from April 2023 to January 2025. Set during and after WWII, the manga follows the lives of two Japanese women who marry American soldiers while their nation rebuilds.

== Premise ==
The story follows Haru and Yoriko, two Japanese women who are separated during an air raid in the middle of WWII. On their own, they find different means of making ends meet (one works in a brothel while the other takes a low wage waitress job), and both of them end up marrying American soldiers.

== Publication ==
Written and illustrated by Marina Lisa Komiya, On Their Frontlines: The Lives of Japanese War Brides was serialized on Leed Publishing's Torch Web manga website from April 20, 2023, to January 30, 2025. Its chapters were collected in two wideban volumes released from April 17, 2024, to April 21, 2025.

In October 2025, Fantagraphics announced that they had licensed the series for English publication and would release the first volume in August 2026. The work was translated by Diana Taylor.

| No. | Original release date | Original ISBN | North American release date | North American ISBN |
|---|---|---|---|---|
| 1 | April 17, 2024 | 978-4-84586-620-5 | September 1, 2026 | 979-8-87500-229-8 |
1. "Murata Yoriko – Showa 23 (1948)"; 2. "Sudo Haru – Showa 22 (1947)"; 3. "Arthur Jiro Hashimoto – 1947"; 4. "Scott Charles O'Connor – 1949"; 5. "Murata Yoriko – Showa 24 (1950)"; 6. "Sudo Haru – Showa 22 (1947)"; 7. "Arthur Jiro Hashimoto – 1948"; 8. "Scott Charles O'Connor – 1950"; 9. "Murata Yoriko – Showa 26 (1951)"; Bonus
| 2 | April 21, 2025 | 978-4-84586-791-2 | — | — |

== Reception ==
The series has featured recommendations from manga artists such as Takako Shimura, Yukari Takinami, and Mengo Yokoyari.

The series was ranked ninth in the 2025 edition of Takarajimasha's Kono Manga ga Sugoi! guidebook list of the best manga for female readers.

Both Publishers Weekly and Kirkus Reviews gave the first volume of the English translation starred reviews.
