= Abandon the Old in Tokyo =

Collection of gekiga short stories by Yoshihiro Tatsumi

- The cover of the paperback edition of Abandon the Old in Tokyo, showing a panel from "The Washer"

東京うばすて山 (Tōkyō Ubasuteyama)
- Genre: Slice of life
- Manga
- Written by: Yoshihiro Tatsumi
- English publisher: Drawn & Quarterly
- Magazine: Weekly Shōnen Magazine; Garo
- Published: August 1, 2006
- Volumes: 1

Abandon the Old in Tokyo (Japanese: 東京うばすて山, Hepburn: Tōkyō Ubasuteyama) is a collection of gekiga short stories by manga artist Yoshihiro Tatsumi. It collects eight stories by Tatsumi from 1970, which were serialized in various manga magazines including Weekly Shōnen Magazine and Garo, and was published by Drawn & Quarterly on August 1, 2006. The manga won the 2007 Harvey Award for Best U.S. Edition of Foreign Material, sharing it with the first volume of Tove Jansson's Moomin. It was also nominated for the 2007 Eisner Award for Best Archival Collection/Project – Comic Books.

== Plot ==
"Occupied" (はいってます, Haittemasu)
An ailing author of children's manga finds out that his serial is being cancelled. Feeling sick after eating, he throws up on the wall of a bathroom stall and finds offensive graffiti. He finds himself unable to forget about the graffiti. Inspired after receiving an offer to draw for an adult magazine, he rushes to the bathroom and draws a nude woman. However, as he had entered the woman's bathroom instead, a woman sees him and calls for help.
"Abandon the Old in Tokyo" (東京うばすて山, Tōkyō Ubasuteyama)
Kenichi Nakamura, a garbage hauler, takes care of his bedridden and guilt-inducing mother. Because his fiancee wants to see his apartment the next time they are together, Kenichi finds a separate apartment for his mother. He takes his fiancee on a trip but abandons her in the train, returning to his mother's apartment only to find that she overdosed using Brovarin.
"The Washer" (洗い屋, Arai-ya)
A window cleaner observes a company president's affair with his secretary, who is the cleaner's daughter Ruriko. When he sees her throwing up in their house, he strips her and forces her to shower while scrubbing her, causing her to move out. While cleaning again, he watches her have stomach pains. He is next shown watching a new affair by the president while carrying a baby on his back.
"Beloved Monkey" (いとしのモンキー, Itoshii no Monkī)
A factory worker, who keeps a pet monkey, is forced off a packed train at the wrong stop. He visits the Ueno Zoo, where the monkeys get agitated at him. One day, in a fit of anger, he writes a resignation letter. However, as he is about to hand it in, he loses his arm in a machine. He releases his monkey in the zoo, but it is killed by the other monkeys. Because of his arm, he is unable to find employment. As a crowd approaches him at a street crossing, he runs away in fear.
"Unpaid"
The president of the failed Yamanuki Inc. still shows up to its abandoned office, where he is hounded by debt collectors. After seeing a flyer, he visits a dog appreciation club and has sex with one. At a creditors' meeting, he is unable to recognize any of the men and his ¥7 million collateral note blows out of the window.
"The Hole" (あな, Ana)
A lost hiker asks for directions from a woman at a hut. However, she leads him to fall into a trap and the woman refuses to let him out. His wife comes searching for him and discovers that the woman suffers deformities from failed cosmetic surgery. When his girlfriend finds him, she wants him to tear up his divorce notification, but leaves when he agrees too readily. The next day it rains heavily and the man drowns.
"Forked Road" (わかれみち, Wakaremichi)
Ken drinks too much at his friend Yoshio's bar, so he is put to sleep upstairs. He reminisces on his childhood, including a traumatizing experience where he walked in on Yoshio's mother having sex.
"Eel" (うなぎ, Unagi)
A sewer cleaner's wife has a miscarriage. Discontent, his wife leaves him to return to work as a hostess. He takes a pair of eels from the sewer, grilling and eating one of them, but releases the other back into the sewer.

== Production ==
According to Tatsumi, the stories "marked a breakthrough and rekindled [his] passion in gekiga". His approach was to use a "bleak story" gekiga style without the gags and humor in mainstream manga. However, due to his background drawing 4-panel and 1-panel humor manga, his works still used straight humor. Tatsumi wanted to depict postwar Japan, where he felt that the focus on economic growth was given precedence over the lifestyles of its people. Regarding his archetypical character, he used him to "[project his] anger about the discrimination and inequality rampant in our society". The idea for the story "Unpaid" came from a "trashy magazine" he had read.

== Release ==
The collection consists of stories by Tatsumi published around 1970. Tatsumi wrote "Abandon the Old in Tokyo" and "Beloved Monkey" for Weekly Shōnen Magazine; "The Hole", "Forked Road", and "Occupied" for the alternative manga magazine Garo; and "Unpaid" for a "cheap adult magazine". Drawn & Quarterly collected the stories, with cartoonist Adrian Tomine as designer and editor, and published it on August 1, 2006. The stories "Beloved Monkey"—which director Eric Khoo felt was too similar to "Abandon the Old in Tokyo"—and "Occupied" were included as segments in Tatsumi, the 2011 film adaptation of Tatsumi's A Drifting Life.

== Themes ==
Scholars have drawn parallels between the story "Abandon the Old in Tokyo" and the Ubasute folk tale about the elderly being left to die on a mountain. An essay in Mangatopia calls it a projection of "the modern problem of caring for aged parents" onto the Ubasute tale and notes the usage of "aspect-to-aspect transition" effects in the story, such as the one showing a garbage dump, which "emphasizes outrage and regret over the throw-away mentality of modern society". According to the author, these transitions provide visual variety for a story that would otherwise just be talking heads. In Aging and Loss, Jason Danely remarks that the story "presents the dull, drudging work of elder care as hopeless; whether in life or death, Kenichi's mother will continue to haunt"; also relating cases of abuse due to caregiver exhaustion, concluding that the story visualizes the "intently affective, visual, and visceral context of abandonment".

Tom Gill of the Hooded Utilitarian finds connections between various stories by Tatsumi: likening "Eel" to the story "Sewer" from The Push Man and Other Stories as well as Yoshiharu Tsuge's "Sanshōuo" (山椒魚; "Salamander")—each dealing with abandonments in sewers—saying that fetuses are "casually discarded by a dehumanized society" and that "unborn babies, like old people in the title story of Abandon the Old in Tokyo, will be discarded if not needed". He views both the utterance of his daughter's name by the protagonist at the end of "The Washer" and the scream at a disco by the protagonist of "Sewer" as signals of "an emotional breaking-point". He also notes misanthropy by the protagonists, but sympathy for animals such as the protagonist keeping a pet monkey in "Beloved Monkey" or the man having sex with a dog in "Unpaid". Gill concludes that the key themes of Tatsumi are:

Sexual humiliation, often accompanied by economic inadequacy, so that a woman cannot be satisfied either sexually or materially; lowly occupations that involve cleaning up the mess created by mainstream society (sewer worker, incinerator, window cleaner); and a visceral disgust about the biological processes of sex and reproduction that parallels a disgust about the inhumanity of modern urban mass society – often shading into downright misanthropy, with a corresponding sympathy for animals.

== Reception ==
Joseph Luster of Otaku USA said that Tatsumi's art style and character designs reinforce the stories and that they linger in the reader's mind long after being read. Carlo Santos of Anime News Network found "greater depth and variety" than in The Push Man and Other Stories due to the larger number of pages available, complimenting their simple layouts and executions, but disliked the endings as well as the repetitive character designs. Greg McElhatton of Read About Comics praised Tatsumi's characterization and found the stories to be memorable, but found fault in the same look of the characters. In a starred review, Publishers Weekly called the stories "a bit more ambitious and sure-footed" than those in The Push Man and Other Stories. Daryl Surat of the Anime World Order podcast felt that the longer stories in the manga allowed for more development than Tatsumi's earlier stories. Ng Suat Tong of The Hooded Utilitarian was critical of Tatsumi—feeling that the stories marked his transition into a rigorous artist, but disliking his repetitive themes and characters, concluding: "These tales are neither close enough, true enough, sad enough nor vile enough to shock us from our modern stupor". In Manga: The Complete Guide, Jason Thompson did not find the collection as powerful as The Push Man and Other Stories, but remarked that "Tatsumi is a great storyteller and his pessimism is profound." Dan Polley of Manga Life noted a departure by Tatsumi from his previous stories in The Push Man and Other Stories and called the stories "Abandon the Old in Tokyo" and "Beloved Monkey" the "shining stars of the volume", concluding that his stories are timeless and have substance. Richard Rayner of the Los Angeles Times described the manga as "remarkable, amazing", adding that "the style is spare, elliptical and it's sometimes necessary to read two or three times to appreciate the full nightmarish power". Austin Ramzy of Time magazine noted that the manga remains relevant, calling it "a revealing time capsule and a strangely moving portrait of survival in a land where everything is changing". Kirkus Reviews felt that the strong illustrations made the manga relatable and that it did not feel dated. Gordon Flagg of Booklist said that Tatsumi's "powerful drawing style depicts the characters with a starkness and simplicity that matches what is presented of their lives and conjures a convincing urban milieu through detailed backdrops".

The manga won the 2007 Harvey Award for Best U.S. Edition of Foreign Material, sharing it with the first volume of Tove Jansson's Moomin. It was also nominated for the 2007 Eisner Award for Best Archival Collection/Project – Comic Books. Time listed the manga, along with Tatsumi's The Push Man and Other Stories, as second place in its Top 10 Comics of 2006.
