= Fallen Words =

Short story manga collection

- The cover of Fallen Words

劇画寄席 芝浜 (Gekiga Yose: Shibahama)
- Manga
- Written by: Yoshihiro Tatsumi
- Published by: Basilico
- English publisher: Drawn & Quarterly
- Published: July 3, 2009
- Volumes: 1

Fallen Words (劇画寄席 芝浜, Gekiga Yose: Shibahama) is a collection of rakugo short stories by manga artist Yoshihiro Tatsumi. The manga was published on July 3, 2009, by Basilico, with Drawn & Quarterly publishing it in North America on May 8, 2012.

== Plot ==
"The Innkeeper's Fortune" (宿屋の富, Yadoya no Tomi)
A scammer stays at a poor innkeeper's inn, boasting of his wealth. The innkeeper talks him into buying a lottery ticket with his last quarter. At the drawing for the winners, the townspeople discuss what they would do if they won. When the man discovers that he had won the grand prize of 1,000 ryō, he starts shaking and goes back to the inn to lie down. The innkeeper finds out the man had won, and having been promised half of the winnings, excitedly wakes him up for some congratulatory sake. However, the man downplays the amount again and chides the innkeeper for wearing his sandals indoors. The innkeeper forcefully lifts his covers and discovers that the man is wearing sandals in bed.

"New Year Festival" (初天神, Hatsu Tenjin)
On the Japanese New Year, a father plans to visit a shrine. His wife tells him to take their son as well and he forcefully convinces him. Along the way, the son increasingly annoys the father, disrespecting and mocking him. When the son begs him to buy him something, the father reluctantly gets him candy. Afterward, the son begs increasingly louder for his father to buy him a kite. However, the father ends up flying and enjoying the kite instead, ignoring his son.

"Escape of the Sparrows" (ぬけ雀, Nuke Suzume)
An artist stays at an inn, constantly drinking sake for a week straight. When the innkeeper is pressured to ask him for a deposit, he reveals that he has no money at all. Instead, he draws five sparrows on a screen as collateral. The innkeeper discovers that the sparrows fly from the screen at sunrise, returning after eating. News of the screen spreads and the inn becomes prosperous, with one castle master offering 1,000 ryō for it. A samurai visits them, telling them that the sparrows will get tired and fade if they do not have a perch, and draws a cage for the birds. The castle master doubles his offer. When the artist returns, he gives the screen to the innkeeper and reveals that the samurai was his father, lamenting that he has turned his father into a cage drawer.

"Fiery Spirits" (りんきの火の玉, Rinki no Hinotama)
Tachibana is a geta strap wholesaler who is faithful to his wife. His friends force him to come to the red-light district with them and he becomes enamored with an oiran named Yugiri. Eventually, he buys out her contract and purchases a home and a servant for her. When his wife discovers this, she becomes increasingly irate with him, saying "hmph", causing him to visit Yugiri more often. His wife puts a curse on her and Yugiri reciprocates, with both retaliating in turn until they both die. Because of their resentment, both of them come back as fireballs and fight, threatening Tachibana's business. When a priest fails to placate them with sutras, he asks Tachibana to calm them down. However, after he convinces Yugiri to apologize and tries to get his wife to accept the apology, he asks her to light his pipe and she complains: "I'm sure my flame will be terrible! Hmph!"

"Making the Rounds" (五人廻し, Go-nin Mawashi)
Seikichi, an employee, makes the rounds at the second floor of a brothel and is accosted individually by four customers who are all waiting for the oiran Kisegawa. The men are angry and start making threats to him. When he finally finds her with her special client, she makes the client pay for the men's refunds, as well as his own refund, asking for him to leave.

"The Rooster Crows" (明け烏, Akegarasu)
A father asks his servants to trick his son Tokijiro into going to a brothel under the pretense of going to a temple for seclusion. When they get there and he discovers the plot, they convince him to stay by telling him that the guardhouse at the entrance of the district won't let him leave without the group he entered with. He reluctantly drinks with them, but refuses to see any oiran. As he is led to bed drunk however, he has a good time and the servants discover him refusing to leave in the morning, boasting: "you'll never get past that guardhouse!"

"The God of Death" (死神, Shinigami)
A wife scolds her husband for not earning the three ryō needed to name their grandson. As the man thought about his misfortune, he jokes about the god of death, who actually appears. The god offers him a solution to become a doctor, where the god of death will stand at the head or feet of a patient to signify whether they will live. As the man succeeds at guessing the fate of his patients (who immediately feel better), he becomes renowned. He spends all of his money at a vacation and when he returns he gets unlucky patients who all die, so he can't accept payment. Desperate, when a rich man's family offers him 3,000 ryō if he can make their daughter better, he tricks the god of death by spinning the body around while he sleeps. Later the god of death shows him that he had traded his lifespan (represented as a candle) for the girl's, who was soon to die, and tells him that he might be able to live longer if he can transfer the flame of the candle to a new one. When the man succeeds in transferring the flame, he accidentally sneezes.

"Shibahama" (芝浜, Shibahama)
Kuma is a skilled fishmonger, but spends all of his earnings on drinking. One day he finds a wallet with fifty ryō and wants to splurge. When he wakes up, he goes to the baths instead of working and treats his friends to food and drink. Afterwards, his wife questions him about how he will pay for it, convincing him that he imagined finding the wallet. This causes Kuma to renounce drinking and to work hard. They start doing well and Kuma becomes a diligent worker. Three years later on New Year's Eve, while they celebrate, his wife tells him the truth about the wallet. When she offers him sake, he refuses, saying: "I don't want to wake up and find it was all a dream again!"

== Production ==
Rakugo (literally "fallen words") is a form of storytelling where the stories are retold for generations, unlike manga, and are humorous as opposed to gekiga, which drew Tatsumi to adapt the stories. Tatsumi attempted to combine the humor of the stories with the visual language of gekiga, two forms which he thought were incompatible, but he later realized that they both rely strongly on timing and that rakugo has much more depth and variety, forcing him to reevaluate the form and see that it was closer to gekiga than he thought.

== Release ==
The manga was originally published on July 3, 2009, by Basilico. Drawn & Quarterly licensed the manga in North America, publishing it on May 8, 2012.

== Reception ==
Greg McElhatton of Read About Comics enjoyed the twists at the end of the stories and found their repetitive nature and Tatsumi's same-faced characters to work in favor of the medium's adaptation. McElhatton notes that the manga is "a bit different from his earlier works, but it's just as entertaining." Publishers Weekly complimented the humor and relatable nature of the fables, concluding that Tatsumi's "flat yet expressive drawings" help move the stories smoothly. Garrett Martin of Paste called the manga "a slight work, but fascinating as a historical and cultural artifact", comparing it to as if Robert Crumb adapted traditional folk songs.
