= Masahiko Matsumoto =

Japanese manga artist

- Born: November 24, 1934; Osaka, Japan
- Died: February 14, 2005 (aged 70)
- Occupation: Manga artist

Masahiko Matsumoto (松本 正彦, Matsumoto Masahiko; November 24, 1934 – February 14, 2005) was a Japanese manga artist. He is considered a pioneer of alternative manga through his incorporation of cinematic techniques into manga from the mid-1950s onward. His style known as komaga, together with the manga of Yoshihiro Tatsumi and Takao Saito, was the catalyst of the gekiga movement.

== Life ==
=== Childhood and career start ===
Matsumoto was born in 1934 in Osaka, Japan. Growing up, his father, who died in 1943, forbid him to read manga. In 1945, during the end of World War II, his family fled to Kobe. After the war, he subscribed to the magazine Shōnen Club and was interested in its illustrations, prose, and science sections. He began drawing during middle school and won a prize for an oil painting in 1949.

During this time, he also gained an interest in manga by discovering the works of Osamu Tezuka. He rented titles such as Nextworld from rental libraries. In 1951, Matsumoto visited Tezuka at his home in Takarazuka to get his autograph. Afterwards, he decided to become a manga artist himself. The first work he drew was the Tezuka-inspired science fiction manga Chikyū no Saigo ("When Worlds Collide") in 1952. While several publishers rejected this manga, the rental library publisher Tōyō Shuppansha proposed for him to draw another work, as they saw that science fiction manga were not selling as well anymore. This led to Matsumoto's debut work as a manga artist, the schoolhouse comedy Botchan Sensei, which was published in October 1953.

=== Komaga and gekiga ===
After creating several more comedies, he published his first non-humoristic work in March 1954, Botchan Tantei ("Kid Detective"), with publisher Hinomaru Bunko. He drew both full-length books as well as short stories for Hinomaru Bunko's mystery anthology Kage ("Shadow") from its first issue in March 1956. Kage is considered the first mystery manga magazine in the rental library market. His work became a catalyst for the manga movement komaga ("panel pictures") due to its innovation in importing visual motifs from cinema. The term komaga was conceptualized as a new form of comic in opposition to the term "manga" and started appearing on the covers of Matsumoto's books and short stories from 1956 on. Komaga is considered a precursor to the term gekiga ("dramatic pictures"), which fellow Hinomaru artist Yoshihiro Tatsumi created a year later. For one month in the summer of 1956, Hinomaru Bunko arranged for Matsumoto, Tatsumi and Takao Saito, to live together in Osaka in order to increase their productivity, and this became a space of artistic exchange between the artists.

At the same time as other manga artists publishing at Hinomaru Bunko, Matsumoto moved to Tokyo in 1957. With Saito, Tatsumi, and five others, he founded the atelier Gekiga Kōbō in 1959. They started publishing the magazine Matenrō as a creative platform for the movement. Until 1962, he produced thousands of pages of gekiga. The atelier was short-lived; it disbanded in 1960 over internal divisions, but was important for the development of gekiga.

=== Late career ===
In the mid-1960s, he slowed down his pace and shifted his career to seinen manga, publishing gag manga like Panda Love (1973) and more personal works. His last published manga was the autobiographical manga Gekiga Bakatachi!!, serialized in Shogakukan's magazine Big Comic in 1979, which recounts his experience of creating the foundations for the gekiga movement together with Tatsumi and Saito in Osaka in the 1950s. From 1980 on, he focused his artistic career on papercutting.

He died of cancer in 2005.

== Style ==
Matsumoto was strongly influenced by Tezuka at the beginning of his career, especially Tezuka's focus on story rather than humor. Unlike Tezuka, Matsumoto drew more elongated characters and made his stories consistently dramatic without comic elements, which Tezuka had included in all of his works. Matsumoto developed the term komaga ("panel pictures") to describe his style in opposition to mainstream manga (lit. "whimsical pictures"). Matsumoto imported visual motifs from cinema, especially film noir, and drew inspiration from crime literature by Edogawa Ranpo, Seishi Yokomizo, and the Tarao Bannai series for his detective and mystery manga. He used low-angle shots, metered breakdown, metered montage, and chronoscopia ("time-watching") in order to provide a film-like experience. Manga scholar Mitsuhiro Asakawa points out the frequency of scenes showing train crossings in his early komaga that are meant to evoke an "excited feeling".

Shea Hennum says his later style in works like Cigarette Girl is characterized by short-limbed characters with abstract faces resembling caricatures, as well as urban background drawings. Publishers Weekly wrote: "He tells stories without complicated dialogue, often getting everything out of a panel through something as simple as emotive, onomatopoeic sound effects."

== Legacy ==
Manga scholar Ryan Holmberg credits Matsumoto as one of the pioneers of alternative manga through the development of komaga, but also says that it is a lesser-known term than Tatsumi's gekiga. Matsumoto was one of the first to use a consistent dramatic, rather than comic, story mode in his manga. Tatsumi was influenced by Matsumoto and they are considered to have been friendly rivals. Shōichi Sakurai, Tatsumi's brother and manga critic, called Matsumoto "the true innovator of gekiga and today's manga" in an article for Garo in the early 1970s.

Tatsumi published the autobiographical manga A Drifting Life from 1995 until 2004 recounting his manga career and the emergence of gekiga, also as a response to Matsumoto's Gekiga Bakatachi!!. From the beginning of the 2000s on, Matsumoto's work gained a new appreciation and was re-edited in Japan by publishers Shogakukan (The Man Next Door) and Seirinkogeisha (Panda Love, Cigarette Girl, Gekiga Bakatachi!!). The 2009 Shogakukan reprint of The Man Next Door published interviews with Matsumoto as well as testimonies by artists Yoshihiro Tatsumi, Takao Saito, Hayao Miyazaki, Shinji Mizushima, Shigeru Mizuki, Ryoichi Ikegami, Kazuo Umezu, Yoshiharu Tsuge, Noboru Kawasaki and Tatsuhiko Yamagami. In 2003, a gallery in Ginza created a solo exhibition of Matsumoto's work. Several galleries made solo exhibitions of his papercutting work.

In the 2010s, he also gained international recognition: his work was featured in the exhibition Gekiga: Alternative Manga from Japan at The Cartoon Museum in London in 2014. His work was translated into English, French and Spanish. Cigarette Girl was nominated for the Prize for Inheritance at the 2011 Angoulême International Comics Festival.

== Selected works ==
| Title | Year | Notes | Refs |
|---|---|---|---|
| Botchan Sensei (坊ちゃん先生; "Kid Teacher") | 1953 | Published by Tōyō Shuppansha in 1 vol. | |
| Yūmoa Gakkō (ユーモア学校; "Humor School") | 1954 | Published by Hakkō in 1 vol. | |
| Botchan Tantei (坊ちゃん探偵; "Kid Detective") | 1954 | Published by Hinomaru Bunko in 1 vol. | |
| Murasaki no Maō (紫の魔王; "Purple Devil") | 1954 | Published by Hinomaru Bunko n 1 vol. | |
| Ningyō Shinshi (人形紳士; "Puppet Gentleman") | 1955 | Published by Hinomaru Bunko in 1 vol. | |
| The Man Next Door (隣室の男, Rinshitsu no Otoko) | 1956 | Short Stories published in Kage; Published by Hinomaru Bunko in 1 vol. Published in English by Breakdown Press | |
| Kyūketsujū (吸血獣; "Blood-sucking Beast") | 1956 | Published by Hinomaru Bunko in 1 vol. | |
| Cigarette Girl (たばこ屋の娘, Tabako-ya no Musume) | 1972–1974 | Short story collection published by Doyō Shuppansha in 1 vol. Re-published by Seirinkogeisha in 2009; Published in English by Top Shelf Productions | |
| Panda Love (パンダラブー, Panda Rabū) | 1973 | Published by Hibari Shobō in 1 vol. | |
| Gekiga Bakatachi!! (劇画バカたち！！; "Gekiga Idiots!!") | 1979 | Serialized in Big Comic; Published by Shogakukan in 1 vol. | |
