= The Isekai Doctor =

Japanese manga series

- The Isekai Doctor: Any Sufficiently Advanced Medical Science Is Indistinguishable from Magic
- First tankōbon volume cover, featuring Yuito Amami

高度に発達した医学は魔法と区別がつかない (Kōdo ni Hattatsu Shita Igaku wa Mahō to Kubetsu ga Tsukanai)
- Genre: Fantasy; Isekai; Medical
- Manga
- Written by: Hoko Tsuda
- Illustrated by: Nobuhide Takishita
- Published by: Kodansha
- English publisher: Kodansha (digital)
- Imprint: Morning KC
- Magazine: Morning Two
- Original run: December 22, 2021 – present
- Volumes: 11
- icon

The Isekai Doctor: Any Sufficiently Advanced Medical Science Is Indistinguishable from Magic (Japanese: 高度に発達した医学は魔法と区別がつかない, Hepburn: Kōdo ni Hattatsu Shita Igaku wa Mahō to Kubetsu ga Tsukunai) is a Japanese manga series written by Hoko Tsuda and illustrated by Nobuhide Takishita. It began serialization in Kodansha's seinen manga magazine Monthly Morning Two in December 2021.

== Synopsis ==
After getting struck by lightning which caused him to become unconscious, Yuito Amami wakes up to find himself in another world. In his previous world, Amami was a doctor who valued his patients' wellbeing. Now in this new world, he tries to use all his knowledge to treat diseases and conditions with the magic and limited technology this world has.

== Publication ==
Written by Hoko Tsuda, illustrated by Nobuhide Takishita, and with medical supervision provided by Tsuda, The Isekai Doctor began serialization in Kodansha's seinen manga magazine Monthly Morning Two on December 22, 2021. The magazine ceased publication on July 22, 2022, and moved to a digital release on August 4 later that year. Its chapters have been compiled into eleven tankōbon volumes as of January 2026.

The series' chapters are published in English on Kodansha's K Manga app.

No.	Release date	ISBN
1	May 9, 2022	978-4-06-527686-0
2	September 22, 2022	978-4-06-529085-9
3	January 23, 2023	978-4-06-530232-3
4	July 21, 2023	978-4-06-531840-9
5	November 22, 2023	978-4-06-533701-1
6	March 22, 2024	978-4-06-534951-9
7	July 23, 2024	978-4-06-535702-6
8	November 21, 2024	978-4-06-537459-7
9	March 21, 2025	978-4-06-538606-4
10	August 22, 2025	978-4-06-540235-1
11	January 22, 2026	978-4-06-541978-6
12	December 22, 2026	978-4-06-546276-8

== Reception ==
The series was nominated for the 8th Saito Takao Award in 2025.
