= Barom-1 =

Japanese manga series

- Cover of Barom One volume 1 as re-edited in May 1998

バロム・1 (Baromu wan)
- Genre: Supernatural, Science fiction, Superhero
- Manga
- Written by: Takao Saito
- Published by: Kodansha
- Magazine: Weekly Bokura Magazine
- Original run: 1970 – 1971
- Volumes: 2
- Television drama

Chōjin Barom-1
- Directed by: Katsuhiko Taguchi
- Written by: Masaru Igami
- Studio: Toei Company; Yomiuri Telecasting Corporation
- Original network: NNS (YTV)
- Original run: April 2, 1972 – November 26, 1972
- Episodes: 35
- Anime television series
- Directed by: Tsuneo Tominaga
- Written by: Shigemitsu Taguchi
- Studio: E&G Films
- Licensed by: NA: Enoki Films
- Original network: AT-X
- Original run: December 7, 2002 – March 22, 2003
- Episodes: 13

Barom-1 (Japanese: バロム・1(ワン), Hepburn: Baromu Wan) is a Japanese manga series written by Takao Saito. The original story was serialized for about a year from 1970 in Kodansha's Weekly Bokura Magazine. It was available online in English through JManga.

In 1972, the manga was adapted into a TV tokusatsu series titled Chōjin Barom-1 (超人バロム・1) by Toei, and broadcast by Yomiuri TV every Sunday 19:30–20:00 from April 2 to November 26. In this TV series, the original story and character designs by Saito were widely changed.

During the airing seasons of the tokusatsu series; due to the naming of the villain character Doruge (ドルゲ, Doruge), a German child studying in Japan with a similarly sounding surname was bullied by native schoolmates - which was led to be mentioned in the newspaper in August 25 (four months later from the airing of the first episode) and also led the series to be aired further with the notice; "The fictional character Doruge has no relation with living people."

An anime version was created and broadcast from December 2002 to March 2003 by AT-X. In this version the plot and story were also changed from its original version.

== Plot ==
One night, a monster: Arigeruge and his team: Okozeruge, Frankeruge, Ikageruge, Kerageruge, Miiraruge, Ebibiruge, Angoruge, Namakoruge, Kumogeruge, Moguraruge, Gejigeruge, Kinokoruge and Takogeruge comes out and starts attacking Takeshi Kido and Kentaro Shiratori, childhood friends who were born on the same day. When 14 monsters are about to kill both of them, a being called Kopu calls and tells them that they are the chosen ones to protect the world from the evil creature Doruge. Kopu gives a radar to Kentaro and Takeshi and the ability to transform into the powerful monster Barom-1 by joining their hands. Now both boys must destroy the monsters possessed by Doruge.

== References to Barom-1 in other media ==
In Battle Royale manga during Yumiko Kusaka and Yukiko Kitano's flashbacks in the second volume (Shuuya Nanahara illustrates a point by mentioning the two main characters of the story).

After having their bodies swapped, Excel and Hyatt from Excel Saga return to normal after Nabeshin's instructions to fuse themselves as a monster that is very similar to Barom-1 (even Excel says she wanted to be Takeshi).
