= Yoshihiro Tatsumi =

Japanese manga artist

Yoshihiro Tatsumi 辰巳 ヨシヒロ
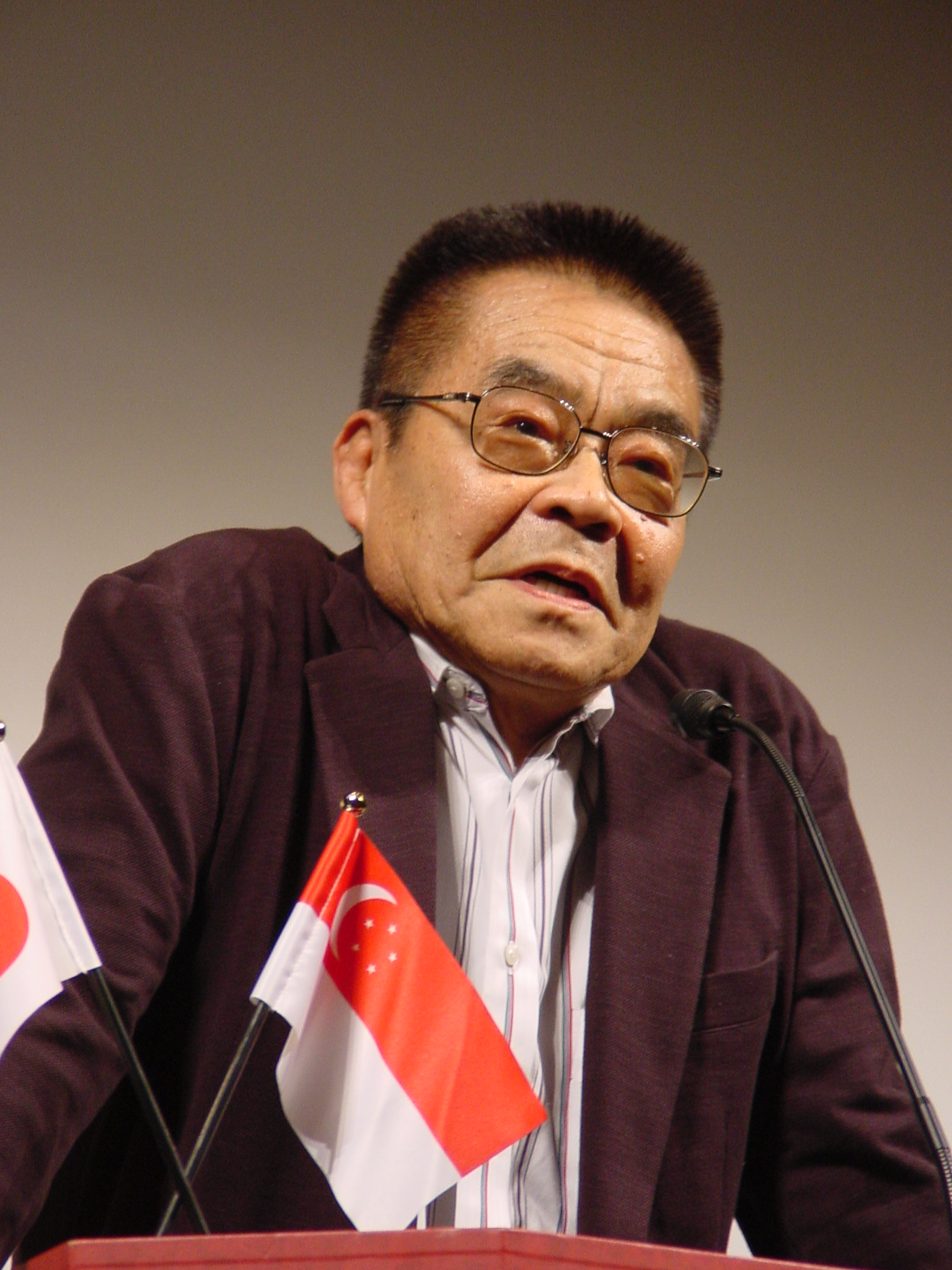
- Tatsumi in 2010
- Born: June 10, 1935 Tennōji-ku, Osaka, Japan
- Died: March 7, 2015 (aged 79) Tokyo, Japan
- Areas: Cartoonist, Writer, Artist, Publisher
- Notable works: Children's Island; Black Blizzard; The Push Man and Other Stories; Abandon the Old in Tokyo; Good-Bye; A Drifting Life; Fallen Words
- Awards: Japan Cartoonists Association Award (1972); Inkpot Award (2006); Harvey Award (2007); Tezuka Osamu Cultural Prize (2009); Eisner Award x2 (2010); Regards sur le Monde Award (2012)

Yoshihiro Tatsumi (辰巳 ヨシヒロ, Tatsumi Yoshihiro; June 10, 1935 – March 7, 2015) was a Japanese manga artist whose work was first published in his teens, and continued through the rest of his life. He is widely credited with starting the gekiga style of alternative manga in Japan, having allegedly coined the term in 1957. His work frequently illustrated the darker elements of life.

== Biography ==
=== Childhood and early work ===
Tatsumi grew up in Osaka, near a U.S. military base called Itami Airfield. As a child, with his old brother Okimasa, Tatsumi contributed amateur four-panel manga to magazines that featured readers' work, winning several times. After corresponding with like-minded children, Tatsumi helped form the Children's Manga Association. This led to a round-table discussion for the grade school edition of Mainichi Shimbun with pioneering manga artist Osamu Tezuka. Tatsumi formed a relationship with Tezuka, who encouraged him to try making longer stories.

Another well-known manga artist, Noboru Ōshiro, also gave Tatsumi feedback and advice. Ōshiro later asked to redraw and publish Tatsumi's immature work Happily Adrift, but did not end up doing so. Ōshiro offered Tatsumi a chance to live at his home "dojo" with other aspiring manga artists, but Tatsumi postponed the offer until he graduated from high school. One of the members of Ōshiro's dojo showed Tatsumi's Children's Island to the publisher Tsuru Shobō, which ended up publishing it in 1954.

Tatsumi eventually attended college instead of apprenticing with Ōshiro, studying for entrance exams, but purposefully didn't finish the exam. He met with the publisher Kenbunsha, which commissioned him to create a detective story similar to the fictional French thief Arsène Lupin, but the company reduced its payment offer so instead he published Thirteen Eyes with Hinomaru Bunko, with whom he would go on to publish many works. At this point, Tatsumi embarked on a three-year period of producing manga for the rental book market; during this period he produced seventeen book-length manga and several volumes of short stories.

=== Shadow and "anti-manga manga" ===
Hinomaru Bunko's editor established a new monthly collection with its top authors titled Shadow (影, Kage). Although influenced by Tezuka's cinematic style, Tatsumi and his colleagues were not interested in making comics for children. They wanted to make comics for adults that were more graphic and showed more violence. Tatsumi explained, "Part of that was influenced by the newspaper stories I would read. I would have an emotional reaction of some kind and want to express that in my comics." In short, Tatsumi aspired to create an "anti-manga manga", against his friendly rival and colleague Masahiko Matsumoto. Some of Tatsumi's first "anti-manga" manga were published in Shadow.

Because Shadow was reducing its artists' output, however, Hinomaru asked his authors to also work on full-length stories. Tatsumi yearned to do such a story, and he pitched the idea of adapting Alexandre Dumas' The Count of Monte Cristo into a ten-volume Japanese period piece, but his boss did not feel he was skilled enough or had enough time.

The publisher put Tatsumi, Matsumoto, Takao Saito, and Kuroda in a "manga camp," an apartment in Tennōji-ku, Osaka. After his brother Okimasa's hospitalization, however, the 21-year-old Tatsumi left the "manga camp." Back home, he experienced a burst of creativity and created the manga he wanted to, titled Black Blizzard. Black Blizzard was created during a boom in short story magazines, so Tatsumi tried to come up with new forms of expression, such as conveying movement realistically, though his art was rough and used a lot of diagonal lines. Published in November 1956, Black Blizzard was well received by Tatsumi's fellow authors, with Masaki Sato (佐藤まさあき) calling it "the manga of the future".

=== Gekiga ===
What I aimed to do was increase the age of the readership of comics. It wasn't that I was trying to create anything literary, but I did want to create an older audience. I didn't do that single-handedly, but I did succeed to a certain level. And, again, part of that was accomplished out of necessity. There was an incommensurable difference between what I wanted to express and what you could express in children's comics.

— Yoshihiro Tatsumi, on being called the "grandfather of Japanese alternative manga."

In 1957, Tatsumi coined the term gekiga to differentiate his work from the more common term manga, or "whimsical pictures." Other names he considered include katsudōga and katsuga, both derived from katsudō eiga or "moving pictures," an early term for films, showing the movement's cinematic influence. Tatsumi's work "Yūrei Taxi" was the first to be called gekiga when it was published at the end of 1957.

In 1959, the Gekiga Kōbō (劇画工房) formed in Tokyo with eight members including Tatsumi, Matsumoto and Takao Saito. The group wrote a sort of "Gekiga Manifesto" that was sent to various publishers and newspapers declaring their mission.

Some authors use the term gekiga to describe works that only have shock factor. In 1968, Tatsumi published Gekiga College because he felt gekiga was straying too far from its roots and wanted to reclaim its meaning. In 2009, he said "Gekiga is a term people throw around now to describe any manga with violence or eroticism or any spectacle. It's become synonymous with spectacular. But I write manga about households and conversations, love affairs, mundane stuff that is not spectacular. I think that's the difference."

The monthly magazine Garo, devoted to publishing gekiga, was founded in 1964. Tatsumi and other influential gekiga artists contributed to Garo.

=== Work of the late 1960s and early 1970s ===
In the late 1960s, Tatsumi worked on a series of stories which were serialized in the manga magazine Gekiga Young as well as in self-published dōjinshi magazines. During this period, Tatsumi was running a publishing house for manga rental shops so he did not have time to work on his own manga; he felt like an outcast in the manga industry. In a 2007 interview, Tasumi described Gekiga Young as an erotic "third-rate magazine" with low pay, which gave him freedom with the types of work he could create. Sixteen of the stories Tatsumi produced during this period were published in the 2005 Drawn & Quarterly collection The Push Man and Other Stories (which was later nominated for the Ignatz Award for Outstanding Anthology or Collection and the Harvey Award for Best American Edition of Foreign Material).

In 1970, Tatsumi published a number of stories that, according to him, "marked a breakthrough and rekindled [his] passion in gekiga". His approach was to use a "bleak story" gekiga style without the gags and humor in mainstream manga. These stories, which were serialized in various manga magazines, including Weekly Shōnen Magazine and Garo, were translated and published as Abandon the Old in Tokyo, by Drawn & Quarterly in 2006. The collection won the 2007 Harvey Award for Best U.S. Edition of Foreign Material. Abandon the Old in Tokyo was also nominated for the 2007 Eisner Award for Best Archival Collection/Project – Comic Books.

In 1971 and 1972, Tatsumi transitioned from rental comics to publishing in magazines. As a result, he started to tackle social issues in his gekiga work, and his editors gave him complete creative freedom. Due to Japan's political atmosphere at the time, Tatsumi felt disillusioned by his country's fascination with its own economic growth. One of his stories, "Hell," was inspired by a photograph Tatsumi saw of a shadow burnt into a wall by radiation heat of the nuclear bomb. "Hell" was published in the Japanese Playboy, which (happily) surprised Tatsumi because the usual manga publishers would not put out that kind of subject matter at the time. Nine of the stories he worked on during this period — which were created without assistants — were published in 2008 by Drawn & Quarterly in the collection Good-Bye, which was nominated for the 2009 Eisner Award for Best Archival Collection/Project—Comic Books.

=== Later work ===
Tatsumi spent 11 years working on A Drifting Life (劇画漂流, Gekiga Hyōryū), a thinly veiled autobiographical manga that chronicled his life from 1945 to 1960, the early stages of his career as a cartoonist. It was released in Japan as two bound volumes on November 20, 2008, and published as an 840-page single volume by Drawn & Quarterly in 2009. The book earned Tatsumi the Tezuka Osamu Cultural Prize, and won two Eisner Awards.

One of Tatsumi's last major works was Fallen Words (劇画寄席 芝浜, Gekiga Yose: Shibahama), a collection of rakugo short stories published in 2009 by Basilico. Rakugo (literally "Fallen Words") is a form of storytelling where the stories are retold for generations, unlike manga, and are humorous as opposed to gekiga, which drew Tatsumi to adapt the stories. Tatsumi attempted to combine the humor of the stories with the visual language of gekiga, two forms which he thought were incompatible, but he later realized that they both rely strongly on timing and that rakugo has much more depth and variety, forcing him to reevaluate the form and see that it was closer to gekiga than he thought. Publishers Weekly complimented the humor and relatable nature of the fables, concluding that Tatsumi's "flat yet expressive drawings" help move the stories smoothly. Garrett Martin of Paste called the manga "a slight work, but fascinating as a historical and cultural artifact", comparing it to as if Robert Crumb adapted traditional folk songs.

=== Death ===
Tatsumi died of cancer at the age of 79 on March 7, 2015.

== Legacy ==
His work has been translated into many languages, and Canadian publisher Drawn & Quarterly took part in a project to publish an annual compendium of his works focusing each on the highlights of one year of his work (beginning with 1969) that produced three volumes, edited by American cartoonist Adrian Tomine. According to Tomine, this is one event in a seemingly coincidental rise to worldwide popularity along with: reissued collections of his stories in Japan, acquisition of translation rights in a number of European countries, and competition for the rights for Drawn & Quarterly.

A full-length animated feature on the life and short stories of Yoshihiro Tatsumi was released in 2011. The film, Tatsumi, is directed by Eric Khoo and The Match Factory handled world sales.

== Awards ==
Tatsumi received the Japan Cartoonists Association Award in 1972. In 2009, he was awarded the Tezuka Osamu Cultural Prize for his autobiography, A Drifting Life. The same work garnered him multiple Eisner awards (Best Reality-Based Work and Best U.S. Edition of International Material–Asia) in 2010 and the regards sur le monde award in Angoulême International Comics Festival in 2012.

== Bibliography ==
=== In Japanese ===
- Children's Island (Tsuru Shobō, 1954)
- Thirteen Eyes (Hinomaru Bunko, 1954)
- The Man who Laughs in the Darkness (Hinomaru Bunko, 1955)
- "The People of the Valley Inn," in Shadow #2 (Hinomaru Bunko, 1956)
- "It Happened One Night," in Shadow #4 (Hinomaru Bunko, July 1956)
- Black Blizzard (Hinomaru Bunko, Nov. 1956)
- "Yūrei Taxi" ("Ghost Taxi"), in Machi ("The Street") (1958) — first published use of the term Gekiga
- "A Handshake in the Graveyard," in Secret Room #1 (Nakamura Shoten, 1960–61)
- Dynamic Action (Sanyōsha, 1961)
- Tatsumi Yoshihiro Action (Sanyōsha, 1961)
- "The Graveyard of the Sea," Gekiga Magazine #1 (Satō Pro, 1963)
- Gekiga College (Hiro Shobō, 1968) — a manifesto
- Hitokui zakana ("A Little Rough") (Napoleon Books, 1970)
- Hitokuigyo ("Man-Eating Fish") (Hiro Shobō, 1973) OCLC 673412591
- Turkish Bath Bastard (Geibunsha, 1978)
- The Army of Hell (Jigoku no gundan, 1982–83)
- Shoot the Sun (Taiyō o ute, early-mid-1980s)
- Fallen Words (Basilico, 2009)
- Gekiga Living (Gekiga kurashi, 2010) — prose

=== English publications ===
- Good-Bye and Other Stories (Catalan Communications, 1988) ISBN 978-0-87416-056-7 — short stories originally published in Japan in 1970–1971
- The Push Man and Other Stories (Drawn & Quarterly, 2005) — short stories originally published in Japan in 1969
- Abandon the Old in Tokyo (Drawn & Quarterly, 2006) ISBN 978-1-894937-87-0 — short stories originally published in Japan in 1970
- Good-Bye (Drawn & Quarterly, 2008) ISBN 978-1-897299-37-1 — new translation of short stories originally published in Japan in 1970–1971
- A Drifting Life (Drawn & Quarterly, 2009) — originally published in Japan in 2008
- Black Blizzard (Drawn & Quarterly, 2010) — originally published in Japan in 1956
- "Love's Bride" in the anthology AX: alternative manga, edited by Sean Michael Wilson (Top Shelf Productions, 2010)
- Fallen Words (Drawn & Quarterly, 2012) ISBN 9781770460744
- Midnight Fishermen (Landmark Books, 2013) ISBN 9789814189385

=== In French ===
- Hiroshima (Editions Artefact, 1983)
- Coups d'éclat (Vertige Graphic, 2003) — re-issue of Hiroshima; nominated for the 2004 Angoulême International Comics Festival Prize for Inheritance
- Les larmes de la bête (Vertige Graphic, 2004)
- Good Bye (Vertige Graphic, 2005)
- L'Enfer (Editions Cornélius, 2008)
- Une Vie dans les marges ("A Life on the Margins") (Editions Cornelius, 2011) — 2 volumes; given the 2012 prix Regards sur le monde ("Worldview Award") at the Angoulême International Comics Festival
- Cette ville te tuera (Editions Cornélius, 2015)
- Rien ne fera venir le jour (Editions Cornélius, 2018)

=== In German ===
- Existenzen und andere Abgründe ("Existences and Other Abysses") (Carlsen Verlag, 2011)
- Gegen den Strom — Eine Autobiografie in Bilder ("Against the Current — an Autobiography in Pictures") (Carlsen Verlag, 2012)
- Geliebter Affe und andere Offenbarungen ("Beloved Monkey: and Other Revelations") (Carlsen Verlag, 2013) ISBN 978-3-551-72326-0

=== In Spanish ===
- El Macarra (El Víbora #47, 1983)
