= Cigarette Girl (manga) =

Japanese manga collection by Masahiko Matsumoto

- The cover of Cigarette Girl, showing various panels from the stories

たばこ屋の娘 (Tabako-ya no Musume)
- Manga
- Written by: Masahiko Matsumoto
- Published by: Seirinkogeisha
- English publisher: Top Shelf
- Original run: 1972 – 1974
- Volumes: 1

Cigarette Girl (たばこ屋の娘, Tabako-ya no Musume) is a Japanese short story manga collection written and illustrated by Masahiko Matsumoto. Matsumoto originally wrote the stories for several magazines from 1972 to 1974. Seirinkogeisha collected and published these stories on September 20, 2009. Top Shelf licensed the manga in North America in 2010, publishing it on May 24, 2016. The manga has also been published in France by Cambourakis and in Spain by Gallo Nero. The French edition was nominated at the 2011 Angoulême International Comics Festival for "Best Heritage Comic".

== Stories ==
"Naruko Tsurumaki's Love" (鶴巻鳴子の恋人, Tsumuraki Naruko no Koibito)
Naruko Tsurumaki's unemployed fiancé Tet-chan finds a dog which he names "Peace". He is attached to the dog, even bringing it with him to a job that Naruko finds for him. Naruko comes to like him and visits Tet-chan, expecting his mother to have kicked out the dog already, but instead finds that she gave him a box to stay in. His mother also gives Naruko her old wedding dress.
"The Tobacco Shop Side Street" (たばこ屋のあった横丁, Tabako-ya no Atta Yokochō)
Rentaro is caught out in the rain and the cashier of a tobacco shop lends him her umbrella. At home, Rentaro's mother visits him, pressuring him to accept a marriage proposal to a childhood friend. However, upon seeing the umbrella, she insists on meeting his "girlfriend". They go to visit a temple together, where the woman demonstrates fondness towards his mother such as by buying her toad oil for her stiff shoulders. Rentaro's mother returns home, telling him that she will answer no to the proposal. However, when he returns to the shop, he finds it has been demolished to make way for a railway line.
"Far From the Festival" (遠いお祭り, Tōi Omatsuri)
At a festival, a man leaves his girlfriend for another woman. Another man picks up the balloon she dropped and the two enjoy the festival together. When it rains, they escape to his house and make love. After he sees that she left the balloon behind, the man goes to her apartment to return it, but finds the woman with her boyfriend again.
"The Heart of Shinjuku" (花の新宿, Hana no Shinjuku)
Yuki asks Kawa, her coworker at the bar where they work, to come with her and pose as her husband for her fourth abortion. She confides that she only slept with her boyfriend because he claimed that they would get married, but he reneged upon finding out she was pregnant. When Yuki gets married for real, Kawa helps her move and finds out that her new husband is a mean drunkard.
"The Taste of Coffee" (コーヒーの味, Kōhī no Aji)
Tsun-chan takes his friend Chi-chan's joking suggestion that they have sex seriously. At her house she makes him coffee, but he likes it with sugar so Chi-chan gets some from her neighbor. Her neighbor, a married woman, gives her advice on a marriage proposal to value men who make money, which Tsun-chan finds "harsh". Later, she goes to his workplace, buying him roasted sweet potato and visiting his house. There, she entertains his younger brothers and tells them she will be living there. She makes coffee for Tsun-chan and his father, and forgets to add sugar again.
"Cigarette Girl" (たばこ屋の娘, Tabako-ya no Musume)
Terasawa is infatuated with the salesgirl of a cigarette shop and buys cigarettes just for her scent despite not being a smoker. After Terasawa's friend suggests that he squeeze a woman's hand to get her going, he does so to his neighbor and immediately ejaculates. They later find out that she has moved and Terasawa is too slow to squeeze the salesgirl's hand.
"Slither" (つるつる, Tsuru-tsuru)
Ichihachi is an entertainer at a geisha house and professes his devotion to Ume, one of the geisha. After he falls off the roof because of a stunt, Ume offers to let him see her, though warning him to not drink so he remembers. Later, a patron asks for his services and Ichihachi ends up going home drunk anyway and oversleeps.
"Happy-Chan" (ハッピーちゃん, Happī-chan)
Toki takes up a job selling condoms door-to-door, but she gets too involved in the personal matters of her clients and isn't very successful. At the same time she also helps to take care of her divorced neighbor Edo and his son, and her love life also suffers because of her eagerness to help others.
"The Red Shoes" (赤い靴, Akai Kutsu)
Kushira starts worrying that she is getting old and wears a pair of pumps to work. After she trips and the heel breaks, the shoe repairer lends her bright red shoes to wear. At work she finds a love note in her shoes and assumes it came from a coworker named Imada, but later finds out that he is uninterested in her. At home she looks at her reflection and laughs.
"A Scarlet Kiss" (赤いキッス, Akai Kissu)
Asanuma helps to take care of his single neighbor Akiko's daughter. His friend Kushigi visits him and finds him hiding unwashed underwear in his closet. Asanuma gets closer to the neighbor and starts imagining himself taking the role of the child's father. The day after he makes love to her, Asanuma finds that her husband has returned and Asanuma finally washes the underwear.
"To Somewhere" (どこかへ, Dokoka e)
After a fight with her employer, Keiko tracks down her old friend Sugiyama and stays with him. He unsuccessfully tries to find her an apartment and she buys them both tickets for "as far as this will take us". They arrive in a seaside town and make acquaintance with an old fisherman, who feeds them. He bids them farewell and tells Sugiyama to take care of his "wife".

== Release ==
The manga is a collection of eleven short stories written by Matsumoto from 1972 to 1974 for several magazines, which Seirinkogeisha collected and published on September 20, 2009. Top Shelf announced at San Diego Comic-Con in 2010 that it had licensed the manga in North America, expecting to publish it in 2011. The manga was subsequently published on May 24, 2016. The manga has also been published in France by Cambourakis and in Spain by Gallo Nero. On its blog, Seirinkogeisha noted that due to resource constraints and publication deadlines, the Japanese version of the manga used dirty magazine scans, while the French publisher remastered the scans which were also used in the North American edition.

== Reception ==
In a starred review, Publishers Weekly noted Matsumoto's ability for showing how people relate to each other and his simple style which uses sound effects, saying "much of the emotional resonance comes from silence and images". Shea Hennum of The A.V. Club called the manga "engrossing and deeply moving", complimenting the coherency of the anthology and concluding that "Matsumoto's aesthetic and narrative style simultaneously push and pull on the reader, forcing you to confront the universal themes of alienation, ennui, and emotional distance."

The French edition of Cigarette Girl was nominated at the 2011 Angoulême International Comics Festival for "Best Heritage Comic". Zainab Akhtar of The Guardian included the manga as part of "the comics and graphic novels to look forward to in 2016". Paul Gravett put the manga on his list of "Top 25 Comics, Graphic Novels & Manga: May 2016". At the "Best and Worst Manga" panel of the 2016 San Diego Comic-Con, the manga was in the list of "Best New Manga for Grown-ups".

== See also ==
- Yoshihiro Tatsumi, Matsumoto's colleague and friendly rival
