= A Drifting Life =

Japanese manga series by Yoshihiro Tatsumi

- English cover of A Drifting Life published by Drawn & Quarterly in April 2009

劇画漂流 (Gekiga Hyōryū)
- Genre: Drama, historical, slice of life story
- Manga
- Written by: Yoshihiro Tatsumi
- Published by: Mandarake (Magazine); Seirinkogeisha (Volumes)
- English publisher: NA: Drawn & Quarterly
- Magazine: Mandarake Manga List (1995–1998); Mandarake ZENBU (1998–2006)
- Original run: December 1995 – December 2006
- Volumes: 2
- Animated film
- Tatsumi (2011)

A Drifting Life (Japanese: 劇画漂流, Hepburn: Gekiga Hyōryū) is a Japanese manga series written and illustrated by Yoshihiro Tatsumi that chronicles his life from 1945 to 1960, the early stages of his career as a manga artist. It was originally serialized in Mandarake's catalog magazines, Mandarake Manga List from 1995 to 1998 and Mandarake ZENBU from 1998 to 2006. It earned Tatsumi the Tezuka Osamu Cultural Prize and won two Eisner Awards.

The work has been adapted into an animated feature film, Tatsumi, directed by Eric Khoo and released in 2011.

== Plot ==
Hiroshi Katsumi (Yoshihiro Tatsumi) and his sickly older brother Okimasa (Shōichi Sakurai) work on amateur four-panel manga to submit to magazines that feature reader's work, winning several times. After like-minded children correspond with Hiroshi, they form the Children's Manga Association. This results in a round table discussion for the grade school edition of Mainichi Shimbun with Osamu Tezuka. Hiroshi forms a relationship with Tezuka, who encourages him to try making longer stories. Noboru Ōshiro also gives him feedback and advice for his longer manga through letters. After Okimasa rips one of his works in progress, Hiroshi momentarily quits manga, but is encouraged after a letter from Ōshiro. Ōshiro later asks to redraw and publish Katsumi's Happily Adrift, but does not end up doing so. Ōshiro offers Hiroshi a chance to live at his home "dojo" with other aspiring manga artists, but Hiroshi decides to postpone until he graduates high school. One of the members of Ōshiro's dojo, Yoshiyasu Ōtomo, shows Katsumi's Children's Island to the publisher Tsuru Shobo, who publishes it, though they preemptively reject his next work. Hiroshi decides to attend college instead of apprenticing with Ōshiro, studying for entrance exams, but purposefully doesn't finish the exam. He meets with publisher Kenbunsha, who commissions him to create a detective story similar to Lupin, but they reduce their payment offer so instead he publishes Seven Faces with Hinomaru Bunko, with whom he would go on to publish many works. Okimasa also joins Katsumi at Hinomaru.

Hinomaru's editor Kuroda establishes a new monthly collection with its top authors titled Shadow (Kage). Katsumi aspires to create more experimental manga utilizing cinematic techniques, an "anti-manga manga", against his friendly rival and colleague Masahiko Matsumoto. Because Shadow was reducing its artists' output, Hinomaru requests them to also work on full-length work. It facilitates this by putting Katsumi, Matsumoto, Takao Saito, and Kuroda in a "manga camp", an apartment in Tennōji-ku, Osaka. However, they are not very productive in the new environment and heat, and Katsumi finds himself attracted to the downstairs Suzume Diner's madam. Hinomaru also ventures into publishing gag panel manga from Tokyo artists, but this results in a large loss. After Matsumoto leaves the camp and Okimasa gets hospitalized, Katsumi and Saito leave as well. Back home, Katsumi experiences a burst of creativity and writes the manga he wanted to, titled Black Blizzard. Hinomaru starts to run out of funds and, after the boss is arrested for counterfeiting securities, Hinomaru goes bankrupt.

== Publication ==
Tatsumi spent 11 years working on A Drifting Life. It was serialized quarterly in Mandarake's catalog magazines, Mandarake Manga List from December 1995 to September 1998 and Mandarake ZENBU from December 1998 to December 2006. Its 48 chapters were later collected in two tankōbon volumes and was released in Japan on November 20, 2008. It is licensed in North America by Drawn & Quarterly and was released as an 840-page wide-ban volume in April 2009. The English version was translated by Taro Nettleton, and edited and designed by American cartoonist Adrian Tomine.

The book has been translated into French as Une Vie dans les marges ("A Life on the Margins") (Editions Cornelius, 2011), and into German as Gegen den Strom — Eine Autobiografie in Bildern ("Against the Current — an Autobiography in Pictures") (Carlsen Verlag, 2013). A Brazilian translation, Vida à Deriva ("A Life Adrift"), was published in 2021 by Veneta.

== Reception ==
A Drifting Life has won the 13th Tezuka Osamu Cultural Prize in 2009. It was nominated for three categories for the Eisner Award: Best Reality-Based Work, Best U.S. Edition of International Material—Asia, and Best Lettering for comics creator Adrian Tomine. It won two Eisner Awards in 2010: Best U.S. Edition of International Material—Asia category and Best Reality-Based Work of the year. In a spate of About.com online user polls in 2009, it was voted seventh most recommended manga for grownups. 11th most anticipated manga, sixth best new seinen/josei manga, third best one-shot manga, and best new edition of classic manga. Shaenon K. Garrity voted A Drifting Life as the tenth best defining manga. It won an award at the 2012 Angoulême International Comics Festival. It was third on The New York Times Best Seller list for paperback graphic books for the week ending on April 18, 2009.

Anime News Network's Casey Brienza commends the manga for "a magnificent presentation, well told and wonderfully illustrated, of an important historical document" but criticizes it for "the specialized subject matter may not appeal to readers who do not share similar, specialized interests". The New York Times's Dwight Garner commends Tatsumi's art saying "is more sophisticated, retaining the form's strange sparkle even at gloomy moments; he definitely does write manga that isn't quite manga. The genre can be a difficult one in which to portray aging. Mr. Tatsumi looks just about the same here at ages 10 and 25". He further comments "a book like A Drifting Life is fairly easy to pick apart on a drawing-by-drawing or line-by-line basis. Don't make that mistake. Its pleasures are cumulative; the book has a rolling, rumbling grandeur. It's as if someone had taken a Haruki Murakami novel and drawn, beautifully and comprehensively, in its margins". Manga Worth Reading's Johanna Draper Carlson criticizes the manga saying, "I was also sometimes uncertain as to the depth of the emotion the lead character was feeling. The obvious reactions were there — determination, for example, to finish a work for a publisher — but the more subtler feelings were missing". Comics212's Christopher Butcher comments "At its heart A Drifting Life is a memoir, filled with a density of details to give it a setting and place that will be immediately familiar to Japanese readers of the last generation but that will largely evade North American ones. This is not a bad thing, if anything the unfamiliarity of the time and place of this story will add to the experience of the lead drifting through his life, tied only to the comic that I hope you'll be holding in your hands". Comic Book Resources's Chris Mautner commends the manga for its "basic bildungsroman qualities. At its heart, A Drifting Life is the simple story of a young man discovering his talent and by extension his place in the world. It's told in as direct and plain a manner as possible, but still full of energy and passion".

The art in A Drifting Life is slightly more varied than what I've seen from Tatsumi in the past, perhaps because everyone here is based on real people. While a lot of the secondary characters fall into Tatsumi's trap of coming out of the same mold as one another, overall I was pleased to see how much stronger the art in A Drifting Life was in comparison to his short story collections. His characters are still wonderfully awkward and gawky, and Hiroshi and Okimasa in particular are wonderfully expressive; just looking at how Okimasa is drawn over the years is fascinating because he's always clearly the same person even though Tatsumi is able to draw him looking both villainous and friendly in ways that transform his entire face. I also really have to give Tatsumi credit for how he draws Japan in the 1940s and 1950s; so much of the story comes to life in the way that he sketches the buildings and streets of Osaka and Tokyo. Between the drawings and the little details in the story about living in that time period (the scarcity of television, the dependence on telegrams rather than phone calls even in the late '50s), one almost feels at times like this isn't so much an autobiography but rather a guidebook for time-travelers heading to 1950s Japan.

— Greg McElhatton, Read About Comics
