= Scott Dunbier =

American comic book editor

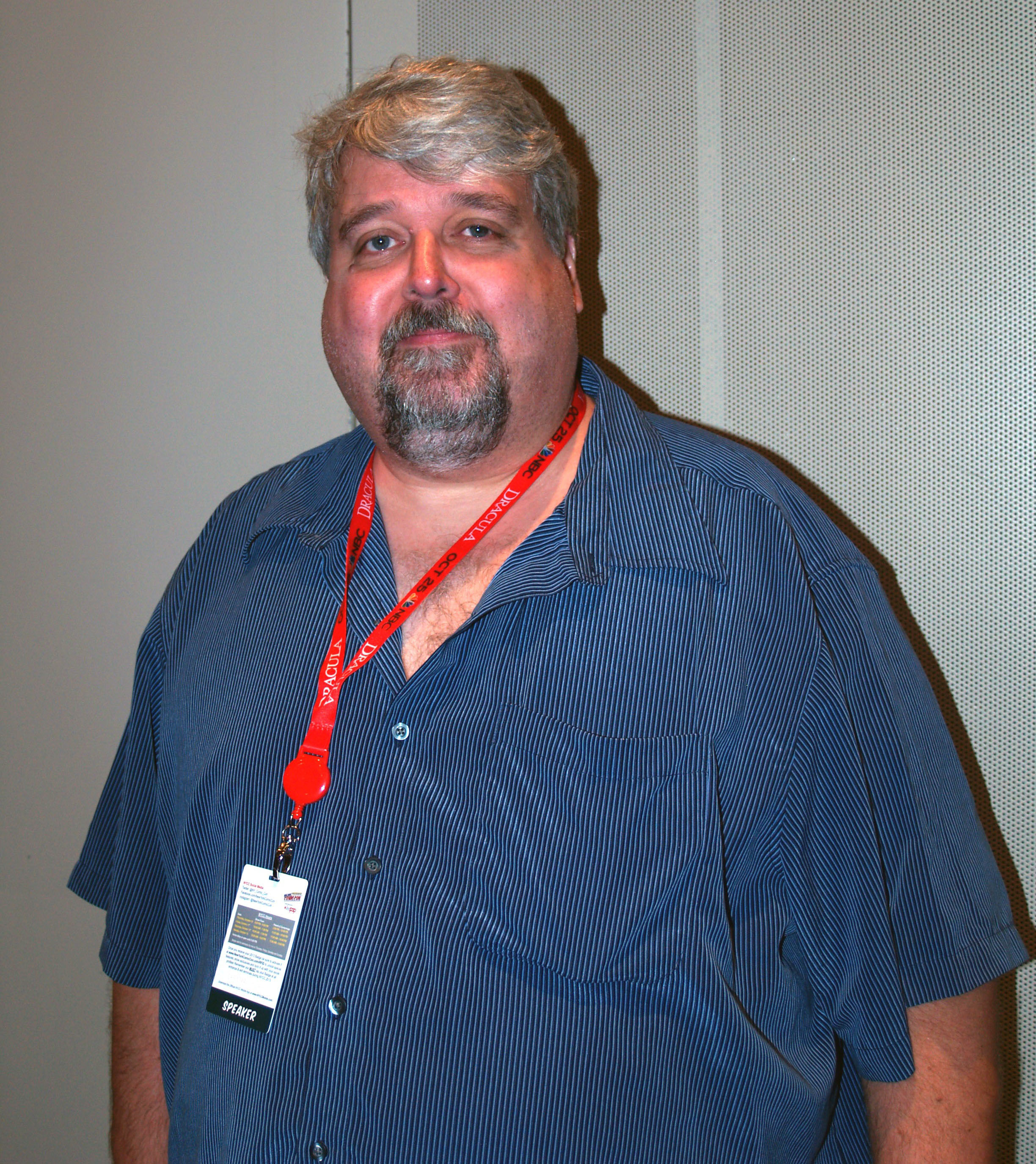
- Dunbier at the 2013 New York Comic Con
- Area: Editor

Scott Dunbier is an American comic book editor, best known as the Special Projects Editor at IDW Publishing.

== Career ==
Dunbier rose to prominence in the comic book industry as executive editor of the Wildstorm comic book line. After several years as a dealer in original comic book artwork during the 1980s and 1990s, Dunbier began with Wildstorm in 1995 as Special Projects Editor. Two years later, he was named Editor-in-Chief, a title which was changed to Group Editor when Wildstorm became a part of DC Comics.

Among the many projects Dunbier edited for Wildstorm were Alan Moore's America's Best Comics line ( including Promethea, Tom Strong, The League of Extraordinary Gentlemen & Top 10), Arrowsmith and Challengers of the Unknown.

At Wildstorm, he also created the Absolute line of hardcover reprints, beginning with Absolute Authority vol. 1 in 2002.

Dunbier joined IDW Publishing as Special Projects Editor on April 1, 2008.

He is responsible for creating IDW's award-winning Artist's Edition line of hardcover reprint books.

In 2023, Scott Dunbier received the Bob Clampett Humanitarian Award at San Diego Comic Con for his work on Comics for Ukraine: Sunflower Seeds.

In 2024, Comics for Ukraine: Sunflower Seeds received the Eisner Award for Best Anthology. https://www.publishersweekly.com/pw/newsbrief/index.html?record=4833

In 2024, Dunbier left his position at IDW to start his own publishing company, Act 4.
