= Tatsumi (film) =

2011 film by Eric Khoo

- Film Poster
- Directed by: Eric Khoo
- Screenplay by: Eric Khoo
- Based on: A Drifting Life and other works by Yoshihiro Tatsumi
- Produced by: Tan Fong Cheng; Phil Mitchell; Freddie Yeo; Eric Khoo
- Starring: Tetsuya Bessho; Yoshihiro Tatsumi
- Edited by: Taufik Ramadhan
- Music by: Christopher Khoo; Christine Sham
- Production company: Zhao Wei Films
- Release date: 17 May 2011 (Cannes Film Festival)
- Running time: 98 minutes
- Countries: Singapore; Japan
- Language: Japanese
- Budget: $800,000
- Box office: US$9,880

Tatsumi is a 2011 Japanese-language Singaporean animated drama film directed by Eric Khoo. It is based on the manga memoir A Drifting Life and five earlier short stories by the Japanese manga artist Yoshihiro Tatsumi. The film is a Singaporean production with Japanese dialogue, and was animated in Indonesia.

The film premiered in the Un Certain Regard section at the 2011 Cannes Film Festival on 17 May 2011. It later made its box office debut in the Singapore box office on 15 September 2011. The film was selected as the Singaporean entry for the Best Foreign Language Film at the 84th Academy Awards, but it did not make the final shortlist.

== Plot ==
The film follows the career of Yoshihiro Tatsumi, as he begins to work as a comics artist in post-war occupied Japan, meets his idol Osamu Tezuka, and invents the gekiga genre of Japanese comics for adults. Interwoven with the biographical material are segments based on Tatsumi's short stories "Hell", "Beloved Monkey", "Just a Man", "Good-Bye" and "Occupied". Toho

== Voice cast ==
- Tetsuya Bessho
- Yoshihiro Tatsumi

== Production ==
=== Development ===
Singaporean director Eric Khoo, who previously exclusively made live-action films but has a past as a comics artist, was first introduced to the works of Yoshihiro Tatsumi during his military service, and says that he immediately was stricken by the sadness and beauty of the stories. When Tatsumi's 840-page autobiographical manga, A Drifting Life, was published in Singapore in 2009, Khoo realised that Tatsumi still was alive and wanted to pay tribute to him. Khoo visited Tatsumi in Japan in October 2009 and received the permission to adapt the work to film. Production was led by Khoo's Singaporean company Zhao Wei Films. The budget of the film corresponded to 800,000 US dollars.

The visual style and storyboards of the film were kept tightly to Tatsumi's original drawings. Khoo said: "You see, Tatsumi loves cinema, and when he created this new movement of comics using strips with real characters, rather than the four-panel manga convention, he produced works that are like storyboards for a film. All we need to do is stretch them out to a widescreen format. And give them multi-planes, like layers, so there is more depth and feel. I also tweaked certain things, changed some of the sequences of the stories, so for the cinema his stories got a new voice."

=== Casting and staff ===
Tatsumi himself was involved in the project and oversaw details to secure authenticity, as well as provided the narration for the biographical segments. Other prominent voices were performed by the Japanese stage actor Tetsuya Bessho. Minor characters were played by amateurs from Singapore's Japanese minority. People with roots in Osaka were sought out specifically, and Tatsumi instructed the actors how to speak the Osaka dialect of the 1950s.

=== Principal production ===
Animation work started in March 2010 at Infinite Frameworks Studios in Batam, Indonesia. It involved a team of 25 artists who previously had worked mainly on syndicated television shows.

=== Music ===
The theme song of this film was composed by director Eric Khoo's then 13-year-old son Christopher. Christopher composed a total of 3 musical compositions for the film.

== Critical reception ==
In a review written at the 2011 Cannes Film Festival, the Hollywood Reporter said reviewed that the film "evinces a mood that is unutterably sad, yet indescribably beautiful.", but added that "the sinister and decidedly adult subject matter may scale down its widespread marketability". The reviewer also praised the three music compositions, which she felt "lend the biographical segments a sweetly rueful timbre". The reviewer also said that "the uncompromising, shattering power of the stories, (made) the account of Tatsumi's life seem less engaging."

== See also ==
- Cinema of Singapore
- History of manga
- List of films based on manga
- List of submissions to the 84th Academy Awards for Best Foreign Language Film
- List of Singaporean submissions for the Academy Award for Best Foreign Language Film
