= Monthly Playboy =

Japanese magazine

- Cover of the February 1988 issue, featuring Brooke Shields
- Categories: Men's magazine
- Frequency: Monthly
- Circulation: approx. 900,000 (1975), approx. 55,000 (final few years)
- First issue: July 1975
- Final issue Number: January 2009; 408
- Company: Shueisha
- Country: Japan
- Language: Japanese
- Website: m-playboy.shueisha.co.jp

Monthly Playboy (月刊プレイボーイ, Gekkan Pureibōi), also known as Geppure (月プレ) or MPB, was a franchise of Playboy magazine in Japan.

== History and profile ==
Monthly Playboy was first published in July 1975. Influenced by the sophisticated designs and contents of Monthly Playboy, a number of magazines were launched to imitate it. However, this was a magazine that translated and re-edited Playboy published in the United States for the Japanese market. As such, it is essentially unrelated to Weekly Playboy. Kazuhiko Torishima, known for bringing Dragon Ball creator Akira Toriyama to the world, commented as follows. "Monthly Playboy was an interesting magazine with cutting-edge contents that attracted relatively young readers in their 20s and 30s, rather than older, and it also had a good advertising strategy". The magazine ceased publication with the final January 2009 issue, due to a decline in readership.

Pop artist Keiichi Tanaami was the magazine's first art director.

== Mika Okuda ==
Mika Okuda, one of the 1988 Playmates, was an original member of Onyanko Club, the biggest female idol group of the 1980s, and was membership number 1. However, only two weeks after the group was launched in April 1985, she was photographed by the weekly magazine Shūkan Bunshun smoking in a coffee shop with five other members. This scandal led to Okuda's dismissal from Onyanko Club. She had dropped her high school credits in March 1985. Therefore, she had to start her second grade all over again in April (schools in Japan start a new grade in April). She admitted that there was a time when she was a delinquent girl before becoming a member of Onyanko Club. She had a part-time job at the amusement park Toshimaen during the summer vacation of the year she was fired. after starting the second trimester in September, she worked another part-time job after school. In August 1986, she even appeared in the photo magazine Emma (Emma).This magazine was published by Bungeishunjū, the same company that publishes Shūkan Bunshun, the magazine that forced her to be fired. She also applied for the idol group audition organized by the manga magazine Weekly Young Magazine. However, she was not selected. After graduating from Tokyo Metropolitan Kurume High School (東京都立久留米高校) in 1987, there was talk of her making her debut as a singer with Polydor Japan, but it did not come to fruition. Her nudity was revealed in the October 1988 issue of Monthly Playboy for the first time after she was named runner-up in Playmate Japan 88.

== Playmate Japan (1986–1993) ==
Playmate Japan (プレイメイト・ジャパン)

- 1986 - Shiho Masui (ますい志保), Emi Satō, Reiko Sugano
- 1987 - Minako Konno
- 1988 - Sayoko Kobayashi (小林沙世子), Mari Kokubu, Mika Okuda
- 1989 - Momo Aida (あいだもも)
- 1990 - Kurisu Aoki, Akio Horisaka, Sachiko Kurachi, Haruka Morimura, Madoka Sugawara, Rie Sugimoto
- 1991 - Misuteriasu K
- 1992 - Kana Aiba, Reira Misaki, Chise Tokuda
- 1993 - Yūko Sugimoto (杉本夕子), Yoriko Ikuta (生田依子), Mio Asai

== See also ==
- Weekly Playboy
