= Takao Saito =

Japanese manga and gekiga artist (1936–2021)

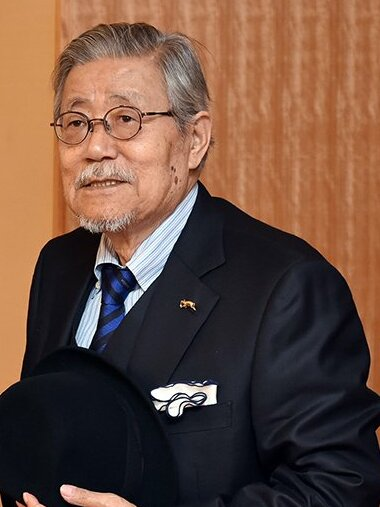
- Saito in 2017
- Born: November 3, 1936; Wakayama Prefecture, Japan
- Died: September 24, 2021 (aged 84)
- Occupation: Manga artist
- Years active: 1955–2021
- Known for: Golgo 13
- Awards: Shogakukan Manga Award (1976, 2005); Japan Cartoonists Association Award (2002); Medal with Purple Ribbon (2003); Order of the Rising Sun, 4th Class, Gold Rays with Rosette (2010); Tezuka Osamu Cultural Prize (2019)

Takao Saito (Japanese: 齊藤 隆夫(さいとう・たかを), Hepburn: Saitō Takao; November 3, 1936 – September 24, 2021) was a Japanese manga artist, although he rejected the term and considered his work gekiga. He was best known for Golgo 13, which has been serialized in Big Comic since 1968, making it the oldest manga still in publication. Golgo 13 holds the Guinness World Record for "Most volumes published for a single manga series" and, in accordance with Saito's wishes, it continues to be serialized following his death from pancreatic cancer in September 2021. Saito won several awards in his 66-year career, including the Shogakukan Manga Award twice, and received the Medal with Purple Ribbon and Order of the Rising Sun from the Japanese government for his contributions to the arts.

== Life and career ==
=== Early life and start of his career ===
Born in Nishiwasa city (now Wakayama city), Saito's family moved to Osaka soon after and opened a barbershop. He did not know he was born in Nishiwasa until he was 43 years old. After his father left the family to become a photographer, his mother raised Saito and his four siblings alone while working as a hairdresser. After graduating from junior high school in 1950, Saito worked at the family barbershop and took it over in 1952.

Having always been known as a skilled artist, Saito drew in his spare time and created his first manga Baron Air in 1955. After having him spend a year rewriting it, rental-manga magazine publisher Hinomaru Bunko released it in 1956. That same year, Saito quit the family business to become a full-time manga artist, an act that angered his mother so much, that she never picked up one of his works for the rest of her life. Under the guidance of manga artist Masami Kuroda, he moved to Tokyo in 1958. In 1959, Saito co-founded the artist collective Gekiga Kōbō (劇画工房) in Tokyo with seven other artists, including Yoshihiro Tatsumi and Masahiko Matsumoto, in order to advance the gekiga artistic movement. The collective divided profit among its members.

=== Founding of Saitō Production and mainsteam breakthrough ===
In April 1960, Saito left the Gekiga Kōbō and founded Saitō Production, a manga studio modeled on film production companies. This allowed for a hierarchical division of labor among staff, including scenario writers, pencillers, background artists, and tone applicators. By the late 1960s, Saitō Production had grown into a manga factory, standardizing output across multiple projects and genres while maintaining a distinctive "Saitō-Pro" style. The studio's model emphasized efficiency over individual artistry, with Saito himself reportedly saying, "Even though I'm an artist, I'm not good at drawing pictures." Saito led the company until his death.

Saito entered the mainstream manga industry in 1963 with 007, an adaptation of Ian Fleming's James Bond novels for Shogakukan's Boy's Life magazine. He started Golgo 13 in Shogakukan's Big Comic magazine in 1968 and serialized it continuously until his death. With the publication of volume 201 in July 2021, it was certified as holding the Guinness World Record for "Most volumes published for a single manga series." In 2013, Saito said "The manga has continued so long that it is no longer the property of the author; it belongs to the readers." It has been adapted into two live-action films, one animated film, an OVA, an anime TV series, and several video games. In 1971 Saito also started to give courses in drawing manga.

Saito was a director at Leed Publishing (株式会社リイド社), a publishing company spun-off from his Saito Production. It was founded in November 1974 and Saito's older brother was its president and CEO until his death in 2016. Following his brother's death, his brother's eldest son took over. In addition to many other products, Leed jointly publishes the Golgo 13 tankōbon volumes with Shogakukan.

Saito illustrated an adaptation of Shōtarō Ikenami's Onihei Hankachō novel series that has been continuously serialized in Leed Publishing's Comic Ran magazine since 1993, although a mistake by the editorial department resulted in the September 2019 issue becoming the first in 25 years to not include a chapter. He initially created it based on scripts by Sentarō Kubota (volumes 1–40), then on scripts by Kusumi Ohara from volume 40 until 53, when Ohara was joined by Kaori Moriyama.

=== Later life and death ===
Saito said he suffered retinal detachment at the age of 28 and was diagnosed as diabetic at 48. He was a close friend of fellow manga artist Shotaro Ishinomori.

Saito died of pancreatic cancer at 84 on September 24, 2021. His death was announced five days later by Shogakukan, along with his wish that Golgo 13 continue on without him. The Saito Production group of manga creators continues its publication with the assistance of the Big Comic editorial department. Leed Publishing later announced that Onihei Hankachō will also continue per Saito's wishes.

== Reception and legacy ==
=== International editions ===
JManga released digital English versions of several of Saito's series, including Onihei Hankachō, Barom-1, Japan Sinks and Doll: The Hotel Detective.

=== Awards and accolades ===
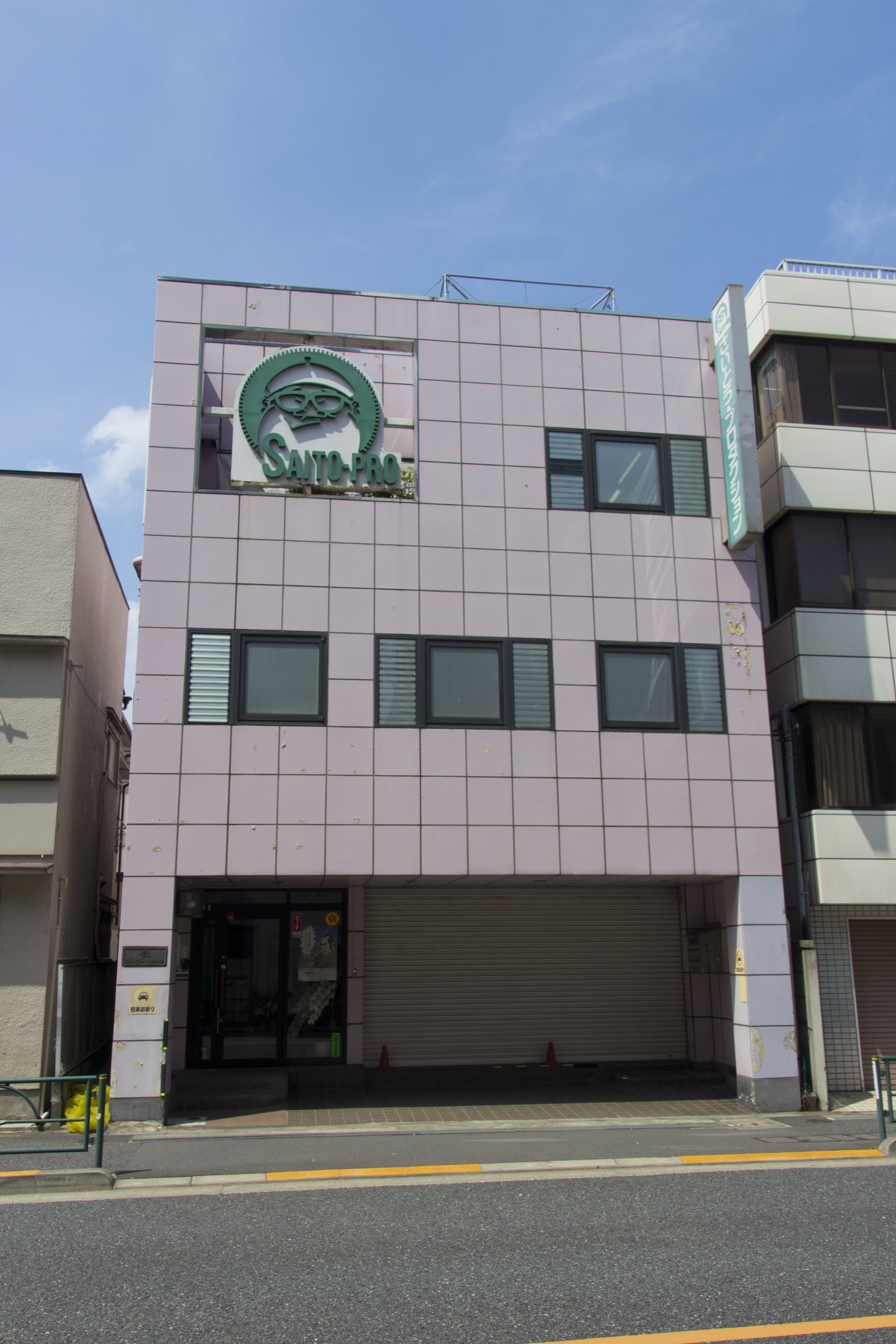
Saito Production headquarters in Nakano, Tokyo, 2021

In 1976, Saito won the 21st Shogakukan Manga Award in the General category for Golgo 13.

In 2002, he and Golgo 13 won the Grand Prize at the Japan Cartoonists Association Awards.

In 2003, the Japanese government gave Saito the Medal with Purple Ribbon for his contributions to the arts.

In 2005, Golgo 13 was one of two winners of the Special Judges Award at the 50th Shogakukan Manga Awards.

In 2009, Saito was among the 158 manga artists invited to celebrate the 50th anniversary of both Shogakukan's Weekly Shōnen Sunday magazine and Kodansha's Weekly Shōnen Magazine at the Tokyo Imperial Hotel.

In 2010, the Japanese government gave Saito the Order of the Rising Sun, 4th Class, Gold Rays with Rosette.

In 2013, over 300 people attended an event at the Tokyo Imperial Hotel to celebrate 45 years of Golgo 13, including Deputy Prime Minister of Japan Tarō Asō.

In 2017, Saito received the Iwate Hometown Special Manga Award at the 7th Iwate Manga Awards for having a residence in Hanamaki, Iwate and including a character from the prefecture in Golgo 13.

In January 2018, he received the Wakayama Prefecture Cultural Award from his birth prefecture.

In 2019, Saito was honored by the Tokyo Metropolitan Assembly for his contributions to the arts as a meritorious resident of Tokyo. That year he was also awarded the Special Prize from the Tezuka Osamu Cultural Prize committee for his contributions to manga over the decades.

On October 6, 2021, the Japanese government decided to confer the Senior Sixth Rank to Saito posthumously.

=== Saito Takao Award ===
The Saito Takao Gekiga Cultural Foundation established the Saito Takao Award (さいとう・たかを賞, Saitō Takao Shō) in 2017 for "outstanding works" created using the division of labor system Saito employed of separating the writing and illustrating of manga. First awarded in January 2018, it is given to the scenario writer, illustrating artist, and editor/editorial department of the winning manga. The prize given is called the "Golgo 13 Trophy", and winners in the writer and artist categories also receive 500,000 yen (about US$4,530). Only professional manga editors can submit nominations. Nominated manga must target adult readers and be completely original works, not adaptations. In addition to Takao Saito (until his death), Ryoichi Ikegami, Jūzō Yamasaki and writer Masaru Sato have served on every final selection committee until the eighth year. Takashi Nagasaki has been on each committee following his winning the first year under the pen name Richard Woo. Yū Koyama replaced Ikegami beginning in the eighth year, while Osamu Akimoto replaced Yamasaki in the ninth. Due to the COVID-19 pandemic in Japan, the fourth Saito Takao Awards presented a Special Award to Buronson for his 48 years in manga and announced that works nominated for that year would instead be treated as nominees for the following year.

=== Recipients ===
Year	Title	Writer	Illustrator	Editor(s)	Ref.
2018	Abracadabra ~Ryōki Hanzai Tokusōshitsu~	Richard Woo	Seimu Yoshizaki	Nakayama, Hirai (Big Comic Original)	
2019	Issak	Shinji Makari	Double-S	Hitoshi Arai	
2020	Reiri	Hitoshi Iwaaki	Daisuke Muroi	Takafumi Sawa	
2021	Not awarded due to COVID-19 pandemic; Buronson was awarded a "Special Award".				
2022	Shrink ~Seishinkai Yowai~	Jin Nanami	Tsukiko	Naohiro Yamasato	
2023	Kēki no Kirenai Hikō Shōnen-tachi	Koji Miyaguchi	Suzuki Masakazu	Tomoaki Iwasaka	
2024	Abura	Number 8	Sakuzo Baku	Sho Kobayashi, Shinpei Wada	
2025	Shimazaki in the Land of Peace	Gouten Hamada	Takashi Seshimo	Kouji Tabuchi, Yuuji Hara	
2026	Chichi o Yaku	Yoshimitsu Miyabe	Osamu Yamamoto	Tatsumi Kato	

== Selected works ==
- Baron Air (空気男爵; 1955)
- Typhoon Goro (台風五郎; 1958)
- Devil King (デビルキング; 1964)
- 007 (1964–1967)
- Muyonosuke (無用ノ介; 1967)
- Golgo 13 (ゴルゴ13; 1968–present)
- Kage Gari (影狩り; 1969)
- Barom-1 (バロム・1; 1970)
- Japan Sinks (1970) (manga adaptation)
- Master Thief Sugar (怪盗シュガー, Kaitō Shugā; 1972), which was adapted into the unreleased NES video game Secret Ties.
- Hawking (ホーキング; 1974)
- Survival (サバイバル; 1976–1980)
- Doll: The Hotel Detective (ホテル探偵DOLL; 1980)
- Kumotori Zanpei (雲盗り暫平; 1983–1988)
- Onihei Hankachō (鬼平犯科帳; 1993–present) (manga adaptation)
- Breakdown (ブレイクダウン; 1995)
- Professional Swordsmen of the Edo Era (剣客商売, Kenkyaku Shōbai; 1998–1999) (manga adaptation)
- Shikake Jin Fujieda Baian (仕掛人 藤枝梅安; 2002–2016)
