= Gekiga =

Style of Japanese comics

Gekiga (劇画; pronounced [ɡekʲiɡa], lit. 'dramatic pictures') is a style of Japanese comics aimed at adult audiences and marked by a more cinematic art style and more mature themes. Gekiga was the predominant style of adult comics in Japan in the 1960s and 1970s. It is aesthetically defined by sharp angles, hatching, and gritty lines, and thematically by realism, social engagement, maturity, and masculinity.

== History ==
In the 1950s, mainstream Japanese comics (manga) came from Tokyo and were aimed at children, led by the work of Osamu Tezuka. Before Tezuka moved to Tokyo, he lived in Osaka and mentored artists such as Yoshihiro Tatsumi and Masahiko Matsumoto who admired him. Although influenced by Tezuka's adaptation of cinema techniques, they were not interested in making humoristic comics for children in Tezuka's Disney-esque style. They wanted to write consistently dramatic stories with aesthetics influenced by film noir and crime novels. Gekiga were more graphic and showed more violence than the children's manga that came before them. Tatsumi explained, "Part of that was influenced by the newspaper stories I would read. I would have an emotional reaction of some kind and want to express that in my comics." The name gekiga was coined in 1957 by Tatsumi and adopted by other more serious Japanese cartoonists, who did not want their trade to be known by the more common term "manga", meaning "whimsical pictures".

Irma Nunez of The Japan Times wrote that "rather than simply use 'gekiga' as a banner to legitimize adult content and realism in manga, ... they developed a whole new aesthetic." Matsumoto's son said that these artists felt that the shorter stories Tezuka started writing after moving to Tokyo, narrowed his expression as action needed to be explained in speech bubbles. Nunez explained, "Structural integrity was one of the pioneers' primary concerns. They experimented with how best to blend images with the text; how a closeup might express the interiority of a character; how to synchronize a story's action with the pace of the reader's gaze as it covered the page".

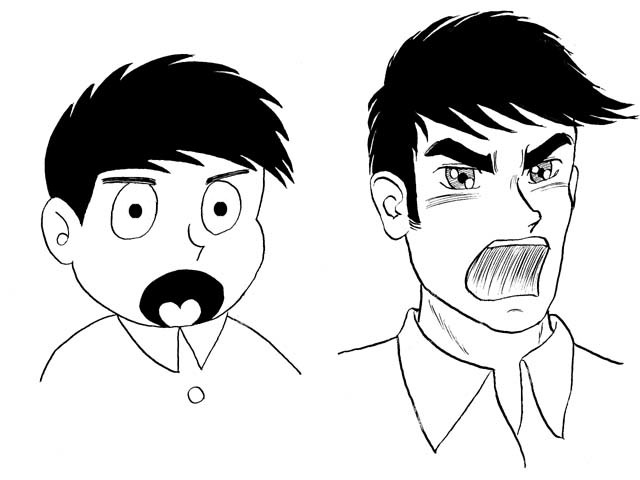
Examples of a manga-style figure (left) and a gekiga-style figure (right)

Rather than working for the mainstream publications, the gekiga artists worked in the rental manga industry; where the work of several artists were printed in collections, that readers borrowed as opposed to buying. In November 1956, Masahiko Matsumoto used the term komaga (駒画) to describe his work Kyūketsu-jū, instead of manga. Matsumoto's son later claimed this work was the basis for what would later be known as gekiga. Yoshihiro Tatsumi's work Yūrei Taxi was the first to be called gekiga when it was published at the end of 1957. Other names he considered include katsudōga and katsuga, both derived from katsudō eiga or "moving pictures", an early term for films, showing the movement's cinematic influence.

In 1959, the Gekiga Kōbō (劇画工房) formed in Tokyo with eight members, including Tatsumi, Matsumoto, and Takao Saito. The group wrote a sort of "Gekiga Manifesto" that was sent to various publishers and newspapers declaring their mission. The Gekiga Kōbō disbanded in 1960 over internal divisions; although as an organized group it was very short-lived, its influence was long lasting.

The avant-garde magazine Garo, founded in 1964, was an outlet for experimental and unconventional works that were "visually or thematically too challenging for the mainstream market". With works like Sanpei Shirato's Kamui, it quickly gained a following among college students. In response to the success of Garo, Tezuka founded the magazine COM in 1967 for more experimental works.

What I aimed to do was increase the age of the readership of comics. It wasn't that I was trying to create anything literary, but I did want to create an older audience. I didn't do that single-handedly, but I did succeed to a certain level. And, again, part of that was accomplished out of necessity. There was an incommensurable difference between what I wanted to express and what you could express in children's comics.

— Yoshihiro Tatsumi, on being called the "grandfather of Japanese alternative manga."

By the late 1960s and early 1970s, the children who had grown up reading manga wanted something aimed at older audiences and gekiga catered to that niche. The Cartoon Museum describes the gekiga audience: "Drawn in a more realistic and atmospheric style with grittier story lines, gekiga attracted older teenagers, university students and eventually adult readers." That particular generation came to be known as the "manga generation" because it read manga as a form of rebellion, which was similar to the role that rock music played for hippies in the United States.

Some authors use the term gekiga to describe works that only have shock factor. In 1968, Tatsumi published Gekiga College because he felt gekiga was straying too far from its roots and wanted to reclaim its meaning. In 2009, he said, "Gekiga is a term people throw around now to describe any manga with violence or eroticism or any spectacle. It's become synonymous with spectacular. But I write manga about households and conversations, love affairs, mundane stuff that is not spectacular. I think that's the difference."

The Cartoon Museum wrote that by the 1980s, gekiga became integrated into various types of manga. "For some younger people the term gekiga is now consigned to the history books, but its legacy lives on."

For a long time gekiga was not translated into other languages, but after 2000 more and more publishers dedicated to graphic novels began translating and releasing gekiga. More recently, publishers like Drawn & Quarterly began publishing several English editions of works by Tatsumi and Yoshiharu Tsuge, among others, increasing the exposure of the genre in the Western graphic novel market.

== Notable artists ==
The following is a list of manga artists known to have created gekiga.

- Seiichi Hayashi (Red Colored Elegy)
- Hiroshi Hirata (Satsuma Gishiden)
- Ryoichi Ikegami (Spider-Man: The Manga)
- Ikki Kajiwara (Karate Jigoku-hen)
- Noboru Kawasaki (Star of the Giants)
- Kazuo Koike (Lone Wolf and Cub)
- Goseki Kojima (Lone Wolf and Cub)
- Masahiko Matsumoto (Cigarette Girl)
- Shigeru Mizuki (Shigeru Mizuki's Hitler, titled Gekiga Hitler in the Japanese version)
- Takao Saito (Golgo 13)
- Sanpei Shirato (Kamui)
- Yoshihiro Tatsumi (A Drifting Life)
- Osamu Tezuka (Phoenix, Ode to Kirihito, Apollo's Song, MW)
- Tadao Tsuge (Slum Wolf)
- Yoshiharu Tsuge (Nejishiki)

== See also ==
- Alternative manga, broad term for outlying Japanese comics, including gekiga
- Josei manga, targeted towards adult women
- Seinen manga, targeted towards adult men
