= Kashi-hon =

Japanese rental books and magazines

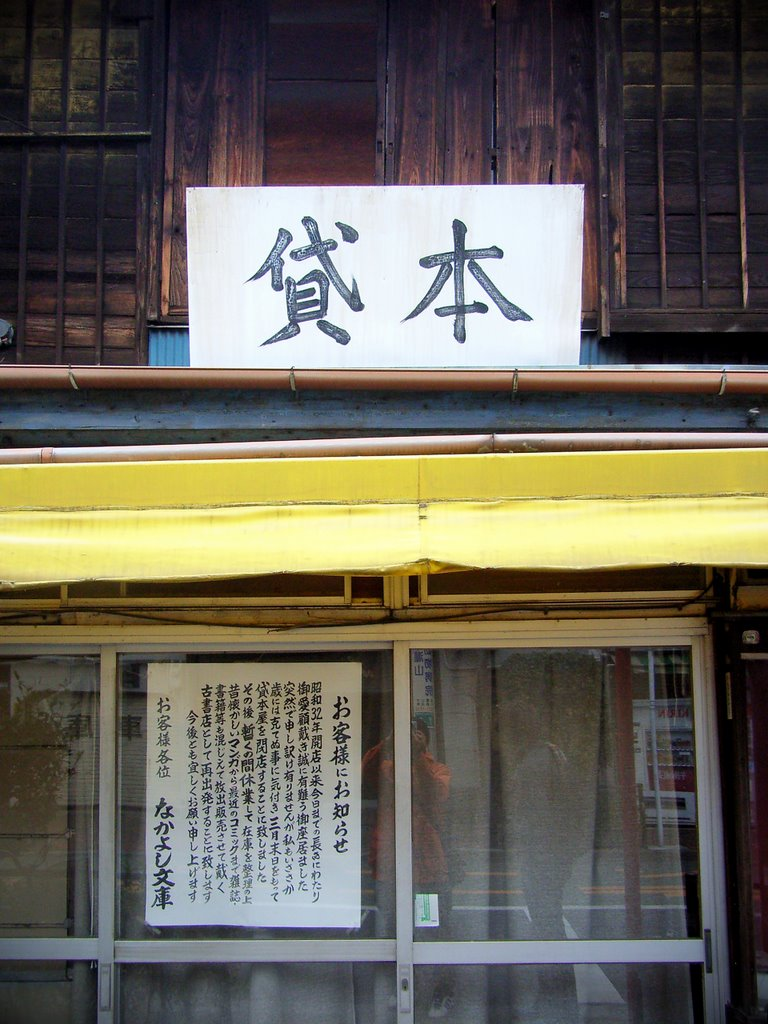
An example of a post-war kashi-hon ya. This business opened in 1957 and closed in 2008.

Kashi-hon (貸本), also known as kashihon, is a Japanese phrase for books and magazines that are rented out. Kashi-hon ya (貸本屋) refers to the book rental service it was based on, also just simply called kashi-hon.

== History ==
Kashi-hon began in Japan around c. 1630 because books were too expensive for common people to buy, and therefore people would prefer borrowing over buying. Some "librarians" would travel around in order to increase their clientele and make more money.

The kashi-hon market exploded after World War II all over Japan. People of both genders and all ages rented books, manga, and monthly magazines. However, when libraries were built nationwide and publishers started to print more copies of their books and magazines so they could be sold for lower prices in the mid-1950s, the number of kashi-hon decreased dramatically. In modern Japan, there are only a few kashi-hon stores left, and the market is very small.

There were some mangakas who started their careers by having their works sold in kashi-hons.

== In other countries ==
Kashi-hon is called zu shu dian (租書店) in Chinese. In Taiwan, it is a store that buys the books and rents them to customers to get the profit. Usually, the books in kashi-hon are comics, novels, and magazines. Besides renting books, some stores help customers to order books and also provide VCDs or DVDs for renting.
