= Seinen manga =

Manga aimed at young men

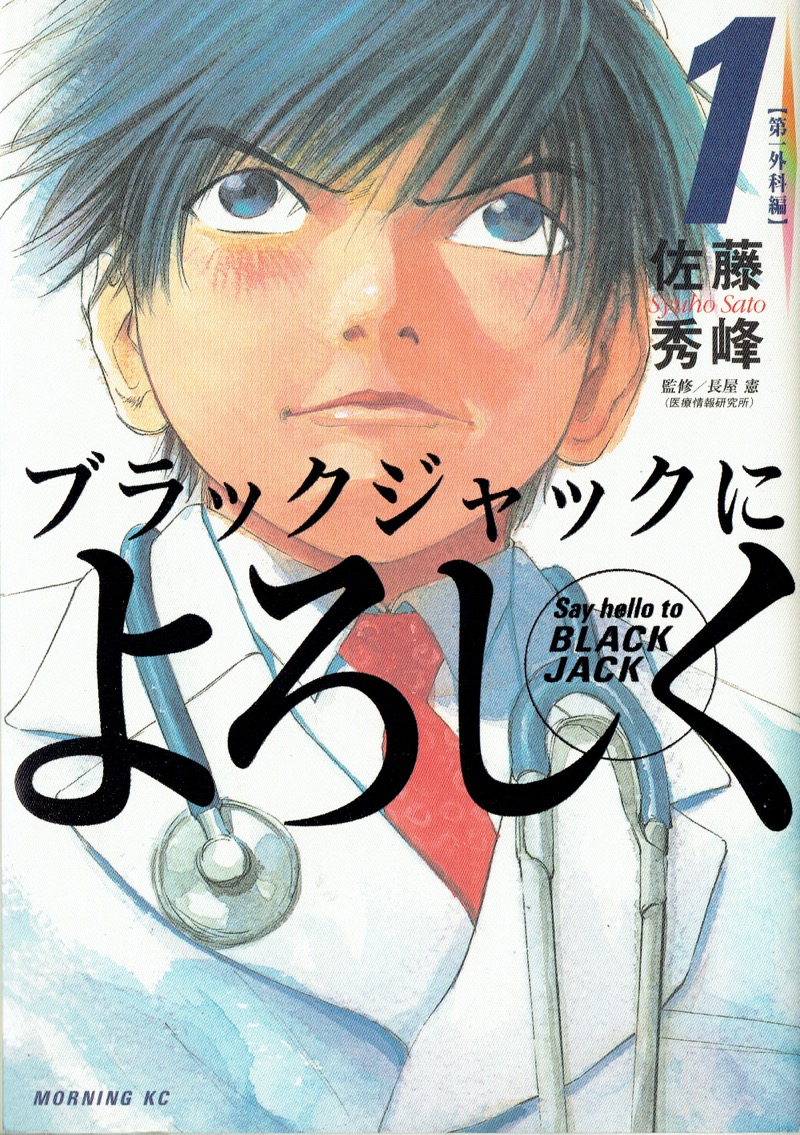
Cover illustration to the seinen manga series Say Hello to Black Jack by Shūhō Satō

Seinen manga (Japanese: 青年漫画; lit. 'youth comics') is an editorial category of Japanese comics marketed toward young adult men. Together with shōnen (manga aimed at adolescent boys), shōjo (adolescent girls and young women), and josei (adult women), it is one of the primary demographic categories of manga.

Seinen emerged as a category in the late 1960s, when a generational shift motivated the manga industry to cater more to adult readers, and quickly came to combine mass-market appeal with more serious literary ambitions than those typically found in the shōnen manga of that era. The manga industry saw a seinen boom in the 1980s, but since then, few new seinen magazines have gained a foothold in the market; instead, readership of existing seinen magazines has expanded. While seinen magazines feature many of the same genres as shōnen manga, seinen manga tends to feature more mature story lines and themes, and it has its own characteristic visual and narrative styles.

== Definition ==
In Japanese, the word seinen means "youth", but the term "seinen manga" is used to describe the target audience of magazines aimed at young adult men. The Publishing Science Research Institute (Shuppan Kagaku Kenkyūjo), which has tracked manga industry data since 1979, separates seinen magazines ("youth magazines"), sometimes additionally labeled as "adult" (otona), from a smaller category also aimed at adult men, "mature magazines" (narunen magazines). "Mature magazines" include sexually explicit, violent, or otherwise censored works such as erotic manga, censored gekiga, and lolicon stories. To avoid official scrutiny and stigma surrounding adult manga readership, major publishers often market general adult content under the more neutral term seinen manga, calling it "youth" (seinen) instead of explicitly labeling it for adults. Consequently, adult-oriented manga is not categorized by reader age but by sociopolitical considerations, with seinen manga referring to mainstream adult titles for men from major publishers like Shueisha or Kodansha, and "mature" manga referring to pornographic material produced by smaller specialist presses.

The target demographic of seinen manga is men aged 18 to 30 or up to 40 years old. However, many seinen works also appeal to older men, although the term is used less frequently the older the intended audience becomes.

== History ==
=== Beginnings ===
The concept of age-specific manga publishing developed in postwar Japan, with manga gradually categorized by demographics: kodomo (children), shōnen (boys), shōjo (girls), seinen (youth or young men), and otona (adults). In the 1950s, manga primarily targeted elementary school students, often published in general children's magazines like Shōnen Club or Manga Shōnen. Seinen manga magazines were preceded by Weekly Manga Times, a weekly magazine for men that Hōbunsha first started publishing in 1956, and by the 1959 emergence of two popular shōnen magazines: Weekly Shōnen Magazine and Weekly Shōnen Sunday.

However, by the late 1960s, Japan's first postwar baby boomers were entering adulthood and at the same time artists began pushing the medium beyond mere entertainment. This shift gave rise to gekiga, a style marked by dramatic, realistic storytelling often aimed at mature audiences, which gained popularity in the rental book market. Gekiga began to appear in commercially sold adult magazines. In March 1966, a 15-page gekiga by Takao Saito appeared in Bessatsu Weekly Manga Times, reprinted from his earlier 1964 work. This marked the first long-form gekiga published in an adult-oriented commercial manga magazine.

=== The start of seinen manga ===
Major publishers responded to this generational shift and the emergence of gekiga by launching new magazines for older readers in the late 1960s. When artist groups associated with the gekiga movement dissolved and the influential alternative magazine Garo lost prominence in the 1970s, gekiga ceased to exist as a cohesive artistic movement. Its themes and audience, however, were absorbed by major publishers.

In May 1966, Comic Magazine was launched by Hōbunsha, and some scholars such as Yoshihiro Yonezawa call this the beginning of seinen manga. Publisher Futabasha launched Weekly Manga Action in 1967. Lupin III by Monkey Punch, serialized from its first issue, became a massive hit.

Influential figures from the alternative manga scene, such as Shirato Sanpei, Shigeru Mizuki, and Kazuo Umezu, found a home alongside artists associated with the story manga tradition like Osamu Tezuka and Shōtarō Ishinomori in new seinen magazines like Big Comic, founded in 1968. Under the editorial vision of Konishi Yōnosuke, Big Comic helped define seinen manga as a "quasi-literary" form, blending mass-market appeal with the ambitions of serious literature. This editorial direction sought to bridge the gap between popular and pure literature (taishū bungaku and junbungaku) and ultimately elevated the status of manga in Japanese cultural life. According to cultural historian Tomofusa Kure, seinen manga also gained popularity because Japanese literature, during the same period, became increasingly focused on internal psychological states, moved away from plot-driven narratives, and thereby lost mainstream appeal.

Apart from Big Comic, important seinen magazines that emerged in the late 1960s were Shōnen Gahōsha's Young Comic, Kawade Shobō Shinsha's Color Comics, Hōbunsha's Manga Comic and Akita Shoten's Play Comic. These magazines offered more realistic, often erotic, and thematically complex stories that reflected the interests and experiences of a young adult readership shaped by Japan's rapid postwar economic growth, rising university enrollment, and political activism. These magazines success These magazines' success influenced older shōnen magazines, which began including series for older readers.

=== Boom in the 1980s ===
In the 1980s, the rise of seinen magazines was one of the main drivers of the overall growth of the manga industry. By the late 1970s and early 1980s, publishers launched seinen magazines for a second generation of adult readers: In 1979, the publisher Shueisha, known for Weekly Shonen Jump for teen boys, entered the seinen market with Weekly Young Jump, Shogakukan launched Big Comic Spirits in 1980, and Kodansha launched Morning in 1982. These targeted younger middle-class men, especially salaried employees, and promoted themselves as offering "quality entertainment like that of novels or films."

The New Wave movement of the late 1970s and early 1980s significantly influenced the development of seinen manga by introducing experimental storytelling, mature themes, and a break from rigid genre and gender divisions. Artists like Katsuhiro Otomo started to work for major seinen magazines such as Young Magazine and Big Comic Spirits and brought a realistic, cinematic visual style and philosophical approaches to science fiction that reshaped the aesthetics of manga aimed at adult readers. The movement also encouraged cross-pollination between shōjo and seinen, with more female artists such as Fumi Saimon and Rumiko Takahashi stating to work for seinen magazines in the 1980s and contributing emotionally complex narratives that expanded the thematic and stylistic range of seinen manga.

=== 1990s–present ===
By the 1990s, seinen manga made up around one-third of all manga output.

Attempts were made in the 1990s to launch magazines aimed at older men, such as Big Gold, targeting the aging postwar generation. However, these efforts met with limited success and were eventually discontinued. Instead, readership of existing seinen magazines expanded. These publications began incorporating sequels to long-canceled shōnen series to appeal to aging fans.

== Characteristics ==
Seinen manga often explore similar themes to shōnen manga, but tend to feature darker or otherwise more mature story lines which may include graphic depictions of sex or violence. Genres of seinen manga, too, are similar to those frequently found in shōnen manga – including action, adventure, war, romance, slice of life, comedy, and crime – but some genres are more popular in seinen than shōnen manga. For example, harem manga is perennially popular in seinen publications.

The visual and narrative style of seinen manga often emphasizes action and makes heavy use of fast-changing perspectives, varied panel compositions, speed lines, subjective motion, and onomatopoeia. According to Thomas Lamarre, the mode of address in seinen manga is oriented around the role of the observer. In erotic series, in particular, the reader is positioned as a third-party viewer of events, typically as a young man observing the female characters. This framing shapes both the structure of seinen manga and its anime adaptations.

== Magazines ==
The following is a list of the top Japanese seinen manga magazines by monthly circulation during the timespan of April 1 to June 30, 2026.

Title	Circulation
Weekly Young Jump	214,000
Big Comic Original	160,667
Weekly Young Magazine	127,875
Comic Ran	120,060
Big Comic	105,667
Grand Jump	82,667
Comic Ran Twins	79,953
Weekly Morning	65,528
Big Comic Spirits	40,333
Young Animal	30,900
Big Comic Superior	25,333
Monthly Afternoon	19,633
Ultra Jump	17,333
Monthly Sunday Gene-X	7,000
Monthly Big Comic Spirits	2,500

== See also ==
- Josei manga: intended for adult women

== Bibliography ==
- Bouissou, Jean-Marie (2010). "Manga: A Historical Overview". In Johnson-Woods, Toni (ed.). Manga: An Anthology of Global and Cultural Perspectives. New York: Continuum Publishing. pp. 17–33. ISBN 9780826429384.
- Drummond-Mathews, Angela (2010). "What Boys Will Be: A Study of Shonen Manga" (PDF). In Johnson-Woods, Toni (ed.). Manga: An Anthology of Global and Cultural Perspectives. Bloomsbury Publishing. pp. 62–76. ISBN 9781441107879.
- Gravett, Paul (2004). Manga: Sixty Years of Japanese Comics (3rd. pr ed.). London: Laurence King. ISBN 978-1-85669-391-2.
- Kinsella, Sharon (2000). Adult Manga: Culture and Power in Contemporary Japanese Society. ConsumAsiaN. Richmond, Surrey: Curzon. ISBN 978-0-7007-1004-1.
- Lamarre, Thomas (2009). The Anime Machine: A Media Theory of Animation. Minneapolis: University of Minnesota Press. ISBN 978-0-8166-5154-2.
- McCarthy, Helen (2014). A Brief History of Manga. Octopus Press. pp. 28–34. ISBN 978-1-78157-098-2.
- Schodt, Frederik L. (2002). Dreamland Japan: Writings on Modern Manga (2nd ed.). Berkeley, CA: Stone Bridge Press. ISBN 1-880656-23-X.
- Thompson, Jason (2007). Manga: The Complete Guide. United States: Del Rey Books. ISBN 978-0-345-48590-8.
- Yonezawa, Yoshihiro (2010). Sengo ero mangashi (in Japanese) (Shohan ed.). Tokyo: Seirin Kōgeisha. ISBN 978-4-88379-258-0. OCLC 731888583.
