= Masako Yashiro =

Japanese manga artist (born 1947)

- 矢代まさこ
- Born: January 13, 1947 (age 79); Iyomishima, Ehime
- Occupation: Manga artist
- Writing career
- Notable works: Yoko Series; Secret Love

Masako Yashiro (矢代まさこ, Yashiro Masako; born January 13, 1947) is a Japanese manga artist. An artist of both shōjo manga (manga for girls) and shōnen manga (manga for boys), her 1970 manga series Secret Love (シークレットラブ; Shīkuretto Rabu) has been described as the first manga in the yuri (female-female romance) genre.

== Biography ==
Masako Yashiro was born Masako Yamamoto in 1947 in Iyomishima, Ehime. As a child, she read the manga by Osamu Tezuka, Hideko Mizuno, Tetsuya Chiba and Sachiko Shinjō and wanted to become a manga artist herself. She began her career as a with the short story "Chiisana himitsu" ("Small Secret") in the rental shōjo manga magazine Sumire in 1962. She moved to Osaka, then the center of the rental book market, and kept producing works for the rental book publisher Wakagi Shobō. She married Masaharu Yamamoto in 1964, himself a manga artist and the younger brother of Sachiko Shinjō. Her most popular series, Yōko Series (ようこシリーズ), published a total of 28 volumes from 1964 to 1966, and had a strong impact on Japanese youth culture of the era.

Yashiro went on to become one of the most popular artists in the manga magazine Margaret following the publication of her 1970 manga series Secret Love (シークレットラブ; Shīkuretto Rabu), considered by some scholars be the first manga in the yuri genre (female-female romance). Its status as the first yuri is contested: manga critic Yoshihiro Yonezawa claims Secret Love was particularly controversial and debated at the time of its publication, while manga scholar Yukari Fujimoto contends that it did not have a strong influence. Regardless, Secret Love is generally regarded as an obscure work, with most critics identifying Shiroi Heya no Futari by Ryōko Yamagishi, published in 1971, as the first yuri manga.

By end of the 1960s, she became one of the leading figures of the avant-garde magazine COM with her manga series Noah o sagashite (ノア を さがし, lit. "Looking for Noah"); her work at COM made her works known to a male audience, and she was one of the earliest female artists to create shōnen manga. She later produced manga for COM's sister magazine Funny, which allowed her to publish innovative new shōjo manga. Yashiro is thus considered a precursor to the Year 24 Group, a grouping of female artists who emerged in the 1970s and significantly influenced the development of shōjo manga.

In the late 1970s, she adopted the pseudonym Mutsuki Tomi (睦月とみ, Tomi Mutsuki). She was active until the mid 1980s and after this only published short stories once in a while.

== Works ==
| Title | Year | Notes | Refs |
|---|---|---|---|
| "Chiisana Himitsu" (ちいさな秘密) | 1962 | Published in Sumire | |
| Hikari no Naka no Kodomo-tachi (光の中の子供たち) | 1963 | Published by Kinensha in 1 vol. | |
| Yamaji Kaze wa Suashi (やまじ風は素足) | 1963 | Serialized in Yume; Published by Wakagi Shobō in 1 vol. | |
| Yuka no Monogatari (ユカの物語) | 1964 | Published by Wakagi Shobō in 1 vol. | |
| Yūhi no Naka de (夕陽の中で) | 1964 | Published by Wakagi Shobō in 1 vol. | |
| Yōko Series (ようこシリーズ) | 1964-1966 | Published by Wakagi Shobō in 28 vol. | |
| Chibikko Seisha (ちびっこ聖者) | 1966 | Serialized in Margaret; Published by Shueisha in 1 vol. | |
| Sachi no Poplar Letter (サチのポプラ・レター) | 1967 | Serialized in Margaret; Published by Wakagi Shobō in 1 vol. | |
| Noah o sagashite (ノアをさがして) | 1969 | Serialized in COM; Published by Mushi Pro in 1 vol. | |
| Noah to Shabondama (ノアとシャボン玉) | 1969 | Serialized in COM; Published by Asahi Sonorama in 1 vol. | |
| Secret Love (シークレット・ラブ) | 1970 | Serialized in Margaret; Published by Asahi Sonorama in 1 vol. | |
| Boku wa Inu ni natta (ボクはイヌになった) | 1974 | Serialized in Weekly Shōnen Champion; Published by Asahi Sonorama in 1 vol. | |
| Peace Bard Story (ピースバードストーリー) | 1978 | Published by Kiten Tenkaisha in 1 vol. | |
| Usher-ka no Hōkai (アッシャー家の崩壊) | 1979 | Published by Shufu to Seikatsusha in 1 vol. | |
| Circus (サーカス) | 1981-1982 | Serialized in Big Comic for Lady; Published by Shogakukan in 1 vol. | |
