= Hi Izuru Tokoro no Tenshi =

Japanese manga series

- Cover of the tenth volume

日出処の天子
- Genre: Supernatural, Historical
- Manga
- Written by: Ryoko Yamagishi
- Published by: Hakusensha
- Magazine: LaLa
- Original run: 1980 – 1984
- Volumes: 11

Hi Izuru Tokoro no Tenshi (Japanese: 日出処の天子; 'Emperor of the Land of the Rising Sun') is a Japanese manga series written and illustrated by Ryoko Yamagishi. It tells a fictionalised account of Prince Shōtoku, a political figure of sixth-century Japan who spread Buddhism, and his unrequited love for Soga no Emishi, which is very unlike the traditionally known stories of these people. It was serialized in Hakusensha's LaLa from 1980 to 1984. The individual chapters were published in eleven tankōbon under the Hana to Yume Comics imprint, which were released between 1981 and 1984. Hi Izuru Tokoro no Tenshi received the 1983 Kodansha Manga Award for the shōjo category.

There is no consensus on English translation of the title. Critics use such various translations as The Emperor of the Land of Sunrise, The Celestial Prince of the Rising Sun, and Heaven's Son in the Land of the Rising Sun .

== Production ==
In 1979, Yamagishi read a book recommended by her friend Masako Yashiro. The book was Takeshi Umehara's Kakusareta Jūjika (1973), which argued that Hōryū-ji was a magical device to confine Prince Shōtoku's vengeful spirit. Later Yamagishi recalled that, before reading the book, she had been interested in the mass suicide of Prince Shōtoku's children in 643 at Hōryū-ji. Inspired by the book, Yamagishi conceived the original plot of Hi Izuru Tokoro no Tenshi and made a proposal of its serialization to the editor of LaLa. The main sources for her plot were Shōtoku Taishi Denryaku (biography of Prince Shōtoku) and its popularized version of picture scroll, Shōtoku Taishi Eden, works dating back to the Heian period.

== Plot ==
One spring day, 14-year-old Soga no Emishi accidentally encounters a beautiful young girl. She is, however, actually 10-year-old Prince Umayado (later Prince Shōtoku), known for his extraordinary talent. Emishi serves Umayado with respect, but gradually becomes aware of Umayado's loneliness. Umayado is suffering from the fact that his mother does not love him, because she senses his psychic powers with fear. Although Emishi also frequently experiences supernatural events that Umayado causes, he never holds any hate or fear. Through such experiences, Umayado finds himself needing Emishi to activate his powers, while Emishi is unaware of that.

Umayado's feelings turn to love for Emishi. Emishi also finds himself attracted to Umayado, but he soon meets and falls in love with a shrine maiden, Futsuhime. Umayado is plagued by jealousy and plots to kill his rival. Emishi finally understands the plot and realizes what Umayado truly desires. After a long and dramatic dialogue with Umayado, Emishi chooses his love for Futsuhime.

While separating from Emishi and being left alone, Umayado seizes political power as the regent of Emperor Suiko. The story ends with Umayado preparing for sending envoys to Sui China. He reads aloud a phrase from his draft of the letter to the emperor of Sui from the "emperor of the land of the rising sun".

== Publication ==
Hakusensha released the manga's eleven tankōbon between 1981 and 1984. The manga was re-released into eight tankōbon, which were released between March and October 1986 by Kadokawa Shoten. The manga was re-released into seven bunkobon, all released on March 17, 1984, by Hakusensha, carrying a sequel story Umayako no Himemiko (馬屋古女王) in volume 7. From 2011 to 2012, Media Factory published seven tankōbon titled the "perfect version" (完全版, Kanzen-ban), featuring reproduction of color manuscripts, cover illustrations, preview cuts from when LaLa carried the original series, as well as Umayako no Himemiko included in the last volume.

Kadokawa released the ebook series in 2021 based on the "perfect version" by Media Factory.

== Reception ==
Hi Izuru Tokoro no Tenshi features gay love as a central theme. It is often acclaimed as the prototype, the canon, or the splendid landmark of shōnen-ai or boys' love manga.

Nevertheless, homoerotic relationships were not a new idea when Yamagishi began her series in 1980. Girl's comics had already provided works depicting loves between beautiful boys, as well as stories of cross-dressing women. Frederik Schodt thus argues that Yamagishi's innovation was taking a prominent historical figure into the boys' love world. Prince Shōtoku, a revered figure in Japan who was featured on the 10,000 yen bank note in those days, is called Umayado no Ōji (厩戸王子) in Yamagishi's plot. Umayado is portrayed as a beautiful boy with exotic costumes. She tells the story of Umayado focusing on love affairs with Emishi along with political struggles in the court.

Hiroshi Aramata evaluates the character setting of Umayado as breathing fresh air into the movement of occultic reinterpretation of history prevailed by the 1980s. Directly inspired by Takeshi Umehara's best-seller book, Yamagishi's work is located in the discourses on the history of ancient Japan in those days. Some non-academic writings, including Umehara's, were trying to reinterpret history focusing on spiritual sorcery, magical rituals, and appeasement of people who were killed for unjust reasons. Yamagishi's Umayado was a perfect character for this reinterpretation of the history of Asuka period Japan. Beyond Umehara's assumption that Hōryū-ji was an occultic device to seal the hatred vibes of Prince Shōtoku's family exterminated by the Soga, Yamagishi created the occultic character of Umayado as a boy with supernatural power. He sees demons, spirits of dead, and even Buddhas. Through numerous conspiracies, he effectively seizes political power in the court. However, in spite of the success in public life, his inner obsession for wanting love of Emishi paves the load to ruin.

The tragedy of Umayado has its root in the estranged relationship with his mother. In that respect, he plays a variation of the theme of matricide by a daughter, which has been iterated by numerous women writers. Although he is male, Umayado often cross-dresses and shows feminine acts. In this androgynous character, girl readers easily find the image of "daughter" as a projection of themselves. As Kaho Miyake states, if Moto Hagio developed the story – like The Poe Clan – a child who killed the mother could eventually find a utopia with an ideal partner. By contrast, Yamagishi's Umayado cannot reach his utopia with his lover. His conflict with his mother ultimately leads him to make a desperate choice.

Besides the inner conflict suffered by him, another point is the way to narrate the role of the prince in the course of history. Hi Izuru Tokoro no Tenshi includes the episode of the coup d'état in 592, where Umayado is not only the center of the conspiracy, but also the assassin who disguises himself as a court lady and stabs Emperor Sushun with a Chinese hairpin. In academic studies of history, the assassination of Emperor Sushun is an established fact. Prince Shōtoku is suspected of being complicit in the coup, or at least condoning it. This high treason incident has been considered the only blemish on his life. His biographers have managed to downplay the probability of his involvement in the incident to keep the public image of Prince Shōtoku as a great, honorable, respectable person. Yamagishi, however, went opposite. Orion Klautau says that Yamagishi inverted the narrative of Prince Shōtoku and introduced Umayado's initiative in the entire assassination attempt. The story thereby describes his cunning, ruthless, selfish behaviors.
