= COM (manga magazine) =

Japanese manga magazine

- The inaugural January 1967 issue of COM, featuring Tezuka's Phoenix on the cover
- Categories: Avant-garde manga
- Frequency: Monthly
- Publisher: Osamu Tezuka
- First issue: December 1966
- Final issue: December 1971
- Company: Mushi Production
- Country: Japan
- Based in: Tokyo
- Language: Japanese

COM (コム, Komu) was a monthly manga magazine started in December 1966 by Osamu Tezuka and published by his company Mushi Production. It was started in response to the success of Garo, and as a way for Tezuka and other artists to showcase more avant-garde and experimental works in manga. Seven arcs of Tezuka's famous series Phoenix were published in the magazine. COM was particularly influential in amateur manga circles and was a platform for many aspiring manga artists to publish their first professional work. The magazine eventually went bankrupt and its last issue was published in December 1971.

== History ==
The first issue was the January 1967 issue, published in December 1966. Osamu Tezuka and his publishing company Mushi Production created COM in reaction to the alternative manga magazine Garo's popularity, which at that time was around its highest circulation. Tezuka himself was a crossroads with his work, shifting to darker themes influenced by gekiga, targeting the readers who had grown up with his work and were interested in more mature narratives. He wanted to create a forum for manga artists to publish manga with experimental forms that would not be accepted in the commercial manga industry. The title of the magazine should stand for "Comics, Community and Communication". In a statement published in the first issue of the magazine, Tezuka explained: "It is said that now is the golden age of manga. So shouldn't works of outstanding quality be published? Or isn't the real situation one in which many manga artists are being worked to death, while they are forced into submission, servitude and cooperation with the cruel requirements of commercialism?" The magazine is considered to be one of the only non-commercial alternatives to weekly manga mazines besides Garo, before offset printing became widely available in the early 1970s.

The audience of COM was around twenty to thirty percent female. In 1969, Mushi Production started the monthly magazine Funny for this audience. Despite its short life (it was disbanded again in 1970), Funny is often credited with influencing the development of josei manga in the 1980s.

The magazine stopped being published with the January 1972 issue, published in December 1971. Ín 1973, there was an attempt to re-start the magazine, but only one issue (August 1973) was published, before it was stopped again due to Mushi Production's bankruptcy.

== Content ==
The magazine contained manga series and manga short stories as well as commentaries and manga criticism.

Similarly to Garo having Shirato Sanpei's series Kamui as a pillar for the magazine, COM published two longer series by major artists, Phoenix by Osamu Tezuka and Jun by Shotaro Ishinomori. Also a few chapters of Ishinomori's successful series Cyborg 009 were released in COM. Regular contributors included people from Tezuka's circle of disciples around the residential building Tokiwa-sō such as Jirō Tsunoda, Hideko Mizuno, Fujio Akatsuka and Fujiko Fujio. The series Tokiwa-sō Monogatari, published from 1969 until 1970, recounted the life at Tokiwa-sō, with each chapter being written by a different manga artist. Other regular contributors were Leiji Matsumoto, Hisashi Sakaguchi and Shinji Nagashima.

COM was also an attempt of Tezuka's to boost young talent by motivating readers to submit amateur work to the magazine's amateur section Grand Companion, or short "Gurakon", and by creating amateur manga clubs, zines and self-published manga locally around Japan. This was inspired by the approach of the magazine Manga Shōnen, which was published from 1947 until 1955 and was the career start of several influential manga artists. Shotaro Ishinomori had made his debut in this magazine and Tezuka had published Phoenix for the first time in Manga Shōnen.

The magazine made a conscious effort to have cross-gender appeal. While the founder and most editors were men, the magazine had many regular female contributors such as Masako Yashiro and Minori Kimura and was instrumental in giving women space for experimenting with narrative and form outside of the conventional norms of shōjo manga. Fumiko Okada in particular, who had been rejected by Garo and made her debut in COM, with her abstract visuals, references to European art history and mix of poetry and comic inspired other women to submit manga to the magazine.

== Legacy ==
Many manga artists who submitted work to the "Gurakon" amateur section of the magazine went on to become successful manga artists, among them Katsuhiro Otomo, Hideo Azuma, Daijiro Morohoshi, Mitsuru Adachi and Hideshi Hino. Many women who made their debuts as professional manga artists in COM came to be influential artists in shōjo manga, like the Year 24 Group members Keiko Takemiya and Ryoko Yamagishi. Moto Hagio also submitted work to the magazine, but was not published, as editors did not see her submission until 1971. Murasaki Yamada, who got her start in the magazine, later mainly worked for Garo.

The magazine was influential in amateur manga circles also after its disestablishment in 1971. The amateur section Grand Companion was kept alive through various zines for amateur manga such as Manga Communication and Apple Core, the latter founded in 1972 by the Grand Companion club of the Kansai region to keep supporting the doujinshi community in the region. Some of these zines were sponsored by Mushi Production. The founders of the big doujinshi convention Comiket had been active in Grand Companion clubs before starting the critic circle Meikyū and then the convention in 1975. Yoshihiro Yonezawa, one of the founders, named the demise of COM as one of the reasons why he and others started Comiket.

In the late 1970s and early 1980s, people around the Meikyū critic circle started new minor magazines like mixing manga criticism with innovative manga with a cross-gender appeal. This contributed to a New Wave in the manga industry. The magazine Peke, one of the signature magazines of the movement, was renamed Comic Again in 1979 in tribute to COM, as they wanted to carry on the tradition of the magazine.
