= Shiroi Heya no Futari =

1971 Japanese manga by Ryoko Yamagishi

- 1975 anthology cover, featuring Resine (foreground) and Simone (background)

白い部屋のふたり
- Genre: Yuri
- Manga
- Written by: Ryoko Yamagishi
- Published by: Shueisha
- Imprint: Ribon Mascot Comics
- Magazine: Ribon Comic
- Published: February 1971
- Volumes: 1
- icon

Shiroi Heya no Futari (Japanese: 白い部屋のふたり; lit. 'The Couple in the White Room') is a Japanese manga one-shot written and illustrated by Ryoko Yamagishi, originally published in the February 1971 issue of the manga magazine Ribon Comic. Focusing on the romance between two students at an all-girls Catholic boarding school in France, it is widely considered to be in oldest manga on the yuri genre made for a female audience (shōjo).

The manga was published during a significant transitional period for shōjo manga (girls' manga) as a medium, characterized by the emergence of stories with complex narratives focused on social issues and sexuality; this change came to be embodied by a new generation of manga artists collectively referred to as the Year 24 Group, of which Yamagishi was a member. Yamagishi drew inspiration for Shiroi Heya no Futari from her interest in male–male romance fiction, particularly the novels of Mari Mori, but believed that a female–female romance story would be more palatable to the teen girl readership of Ribon Comic. Following its publication in Ribon Comic, Shiroi Heya no Futari was republished several times in anthologies of short works by Yamagishi.

Shiroi Heya no Futari was one of a number of works of shōjo manga that emerged in the late 1960s and early 1970s which depicted intimate relationships between female characters; it was, strictly speaking, not the first manga to depict a female same-sex relationship. It is nevertheless widely regarded as a foundational work in the yuri genre due to the extent to which its plot conceit of a tragic romance between a stern dark-haired girl and a naïve light-haired girl became an archetypal yuri story formula, recurring frequently in manga that depicts romance between female characters.

== Plot ==
Resine de Poisson (レシーヌ・ド・ポアッソン, Reshīnu do Poasson) enrolls at a Catholic all-girls boarding school in France formerly attended by her late mother, where she is roomed with the rebellious Simone D'Arc (シモーン・ダルク, Shimōn Daruku). Though Simone is initially hostile towards the naïve Resine, the two girls gradually grow closer, with Simone going so far as to recite a love poem by Rainer Maria Rilke in front of their class that she dedicates to Resine.

A performance of Romeo and Juliet is organized to celebrate the school's fiftieth anniversary, with Simone cast as Romeo and Resine as Juliet. During the performance, Simone passionately kisses Resine on stage. Rumors begin to circulate that the relationship between Simone and Resine is of a romantic nature. Distraught by the rumors, Resine cuts all ties with Simone and leaves the boarding school. Unable to bear Resine's rejection, Simone enters a period of reckless self-destruction that culminates in her goading a man she has started dating into stabbing and killing her. Upon learning of Simone's death, a devastated Resine vows to never love again, and to mourn Simone for the rest of her life.

== Production ==
=== Context ===
The yuri genre focuses on intimate relationships between female characters, encompassing a spectrum from romantic friendships to lesbianism. While the genre was not formalized until the early 2000s with the establishment of dedicated yuri fiction magazines, the history of the yuri genre spans to the beginning of the 20th century. Beginning in the 1910s, a genre of fiction depicting romantic friendships between female characters referred to as Class S emerged. Class S stories were regularly published in shōjo publications and kashi-hon (rental books), notably Hana Monogatari (1916–1926) by Nobuko Yoshiya and Sakura Namiki (1957) by Macoto Takahashi.

Around 1970, shōjo magazines began to publish stories that extended beyond traditional Class S story formulas to depict lesbianism and other intimate relationships between female characters, such as Glass no Shiro (1969–1970) by Masako Watanabe, Secret Love (1970) by Masako Yashiro, Futari Pocchi (1971) by Riyoko Ikeda, Maya no Sōretsu (1972) by Yukari Ichijo, and Aries no Otometachi (1973–1975) by Machiko Satonaka. Shiroi Heya no Futari, published in February 1971, belongs to this canon of works. These shifts reflected a broader reorientation of shōjo manga towards more narratively complex stories that focused on social issues, politics, and sexuality, and came to be embodied by a grouping of manga artists collectively referred to as the Year 24 Group, (Note: The group was so named because its members were born in or around year 24 of the Shōwa era (or 1949 in the Gregorian calendar).) of which Shiroi Heya no Futari author Ryoko Yamagishi was a member.

=== Development and release ===
Yamagishi began her career as a manga artist in 1969 after being hired at the shōjo manga (girls manga) magazine Ribon Comic, a supplement to the manga magazine Ribon. Ribon Comic targeted a readership of girls aged sixteen and older, primarily published new and relatively unknown authors, and had an editorial focus on self-contained short stories that frequently addressed social issues.

Yamagishi was fascinated by stories that depicted camaraderie and deep bonds between men, beginning with Shōnen Kenya by Sōji Yamakawa in her youth and later discovering the tanbi (male–male romance) novels of Mari Mori while in college. However, she considered her interest in homosexuality and homoeroticism to be abnormal and strange, and initially did not wish to depict the subject when she became a manga artist. She chose to instead create a story about female–female romance, believing that it would be more readily accepted by the teen girl readership of Ribon Comic.

That story, Shiroi Heya no Futari, was accepted by her editor and published in the February 1971 issue of Ribon Comic. Shiroi Heya no Futari was advertised on the cover of the issue as one of a series of long stories published in that issue. The first page of the manga was printed in full color, an unusual practice for manga magazines at the time, while its second page was colored in orange, purple and white.

Shiroi Heya no Futari has been republished several times in anthologies of short works by Yamagishi. Shueisha collected the manga along with two other short stories by Yamagishi into a compiled volume of the same name, published under the Ribon Mascot Comics imprint on September 10, 1973. Hakusensha reprinted the volume under the Hana to Yume Comics imprint on August 10, 1975. Kadokawa Shoten included Shiori Heya no Futari in volume 28 of their series of Yamagishi's complete works, published under the Asuka Comics Special imprint on March 4, 1988.

== Reception and legacy ==
While Shiroi Heya no Futari was not the first manga to depict a female same-sex relationship, it is considered to be the first work for a shoujo demographic in the genre that would become known as yuri. (Note: Secret Love (シークレットラブ, Shīkuretto Rabu) by Masako Yashiro, a manga about a love triangle between two girls and a boy first published in 1970, was the first non–Class S manga to depict an intimate relationship between two women.) Manga scholar Yukari Fujimoto argues that Shiroi Heya no Futari's status as a foundational work in the genre can be owed to the extent to which its plot became an archetypal yuri story, significantly influencing works in the genre in the years following its publication.

Manga critics Yoshihiro Yonezawa and Yōji Takahashi consider Shiroi Heya no Futari to be typical of the "radical" social issue-focused output of Ribon Comic. Yonezawa notes that the manga deviates significantly from Yamagishi's subsequent editorial output, more closely resembling shōjo shōsetsu (girls' novels) and the works of author Nobuko Yoshiya. Shiroi Heya no Futari was favorably assessed by the yuri manga magazines Yuri Shimai and Comic Yuri Hime in their 2012 retrospective of the genre.

Yuricon founder Erica Friedman writes that she appreciates the "hyper melodramatic" aspects of Shiroi Heya no Futari, comparing it to American lesbian pulp fiction published during the same period. Critic Karen Merveille, writing for the French publication Manga 10,000 Images in 2010, stated that while she considered Shiroi Heya no Futari overly pessimistic, it nevertheless has merit as a pioneering work.

== Analysis ==
=== "Crimson Rose and Candy Girl" ===
Resine is a character defined by her guilelessness and shyness, contrasting Simone's rebellious delinquency; though their differing natures initially cause conflict, they gradually grow closer before being tragically separated. While similar dynamics appeared frequently in shōjo romances of the 1970s regardless of gender or sexuality, such as Candy and Terrence of Candy Candy (1975–1979) and Gilbert and Serge of Kaze to Ki no Uta (1976–1984), manga scholar Yukari Fujimoto credits Shiroi Heya no Futari's expression of this dynamic with originating a common yuri story formula that she dubs "Crimson Rose and Candy Girl".

In these stories, "Rose" is a beautiful, strong, and enterprising dark-haired girl, while "Candy" is a naïve and more feminine light-haired girl. This dynamic is roughly analogous to the butch and femme dichotomy in broader lesbian culture, and its Japanese equivalent tachi and neko. The characters grow closer to each other, oftentimes bonding over a shared problem such as familial drama, causing their relationship to become the subject of cruel rumors and threats. The story concludes with Rose dying, typically by suicide, in order to protect Candy from scandal. Fujimoto writes that the Crimson Rose and Candy Girl dynamic, as established by Shiroi Heya no Futari, became the archetypical depiction of female same-sex romance in manga. Notable examples include Hadashi no Mei (1974) and Kurenai ni Moyu (1979) by Hiroko Fukuhara, Kanojotachi (1982) by Michiyo Kashi, and Ibutachi no Heya (1983) by Sachiko Nagahama.

Manga depicting female–female romance gradually drifted away from the tragic Crimson Rose and Candy Girl formula over the subsequent decades, with works that featured a less tortured "Rose" and a "Candy" who more willingly acknowledges and accepts her feelings of same-sex desire. Friedman considers Citrus (2012–2018) by Saburouta, a major yuri manga of the 2010s, as a positive "ripple" of Shiroi Heya no Futari in this regard. James Welker of Kanagawa University argues that Crimson Rose and Candy Girl narratives represent a form of "lesbian panic", where the character – and by extension, the author – refuses their own lesbian feelings and desires.

=== Style ===
Shiroi Heya no Futari uses a romantic style that had become recently popular in shōjo manga of its era, characterized by large-eyed protagonists with long, flowing hair, as well as the heavy use of symbolism and decorative elements. The dramatic and tragic atmosphere is reinforced by the French environment, the use of swirling leaves and petals that punctuate different scenes, and by literary references to Shakespeare and Rilke. Friedman notes that the manga was "meant to be cutting edge" in its treatment of its setting – the characters wear 1970s fashions, and attend clubs and bars where they smoke cigarettes and drink – but that these elements may seem "dated and campy" to a modern reader.

The two protagonists are visually constructed as opposites. Each is associated with a flower – Simone with a rose, connotes passion but also suffering with its thorns, while Resine is associated with the soft and fragile daisy. They are additionally contrasted through black-and-white dualism, most obviously visible in Resine's blonde hair and Simone's black hair.
