= Ryoko Yamagishi =

Japanese manga artist (born 1947)

Ryoko Yamagishi 山岸 凉子
- Born: September 24, 1947 (age 79) Kamisunagawa, Hokkaido, Japan
- Area: Manga artist
- Notable works: Shiroi Heya no Futari; Hi Izuru Tokoro no Tenshi; Maihime Terpsichora
- Awards: 1983 Kodansha Manga Award for shōjo manga; Grand Prize, 11th Annual Tezuka Osamu Cultural Prize

Ryoko Yamagishi (山岸 凉子, Yamagishi Ryōko; born September 24, 1947, in Kamisunagawa, Hokkaido) is a Japanese manga artist. She is a member of the Year 24 Group, as one of the female artists who innovated shōjo (girls') manga throughout the 1970s. Her major works include Hi Izuru Tokoro no Tenshi and Maihime Terpsichora.

== Life and career ==
Ryoko Yamagishi was born on September 24, 1947, in Kamisunagawa, Hokkaido, Japan. As a child, she studied ballet, which plays a part in many of her works. When she read the manga of Machiko Satonaka in 1964, she decided to pursue becoming a manga artist. Although her parents did not agree with this, in 1966 she entered a competition in Shōjo Friend and was a semi-finalist. She applied to Kodansha and sent some short stories to COM. In 1968, after completing her art studies in Hokkaido, she moved to Tokyo and applied for Shueisha. The next year, she made her professional debut with Left and Right, a short story published in Ribon Comic, a spin-off of Ribon.

In 1971, she released the one-shot manga Shiroi Heya no Futari, which tells the story of a romance between two students at an all-girls boarding school in France. It was published by Shueisha in Ribon Comic and is regarded as the first yuri (female-female romance) manga.

== Style and themes ==
Her works normally have occult themes, although her most popular are Arabesque, about Russian ballet, and Hi Izuru Tokoro no Tenshi. According to Yoshihiro Yonezawa, Yamagishi's style is influenced by Art Nouveau.

== Reception ==
In 1983, she won the Kodansha Manga Award in the shōjo manga category for Hi Izuru Tokoro no Tenshi.

She worked on Maihime Terpsichora, which was nominated for the 9th annual Tezuka Osamu Cultural Prize in 2005 and won the 11th annual Tezuka Osamu Cultural Prize in 2007. It was also among the jury-selected works of Japan Media Arts Festival 2002.

Her work was exhibited at the Yayoi Museum in Tokyo from September to December 2016.

== Works ==
=== Serializations ===
List of serialized manga by Ryoko Yamagishi
Title	Year(s)	Notes	Ref(s)
Arabesque: Part 1 (アラベスク（第1部）)	1971–1973	Serialized in Ribon; Published by Shueisha in 4 volumes	
Arabesque: Part 2 (アラベスク（第2部）)	1974–1975	Serialized in Hana to Yume; Published by Hakusensha in 4 volumes	
Metamorphosis Den (メタモルフォシス伝)	1976	Serialized in Hana to Yume; Published by Hakusensha in 2 volumes	
Yōsei-ō (妖精王)	1977–1978	Serialized in Hana to Yume; Published by Hakusensha in 5 volumes Adapted into an OVA by Madhouse in 1988	
Hi Izuru Tokoro no Tenshi (日出処の天子)	1980–1984	Serialized in LaLa; Published by Hakusensha in 11 volumes Based on the life of Prince Shōtoku	
Yamato Takeru (ヤマトタケル)	1986–1987	Serialized in Monthly Asuka; Published by Kadokawa Shoten in 1 volume Based on the kabuki play by Takeshi Umehara	
Fūin (封印)	1994–1995	Serialized in LaLa; Published by Hakusensha in 2 volumes Re-released as Tutankhamun volumes 1–2	
Tutankhamun (ツタンカーメン)	1996–1997	Serialized in Comic Tom; Published by Ushio Publishing in 2 volumes Combined with Fūin for a total of 4 volumes	
Oni (鬼)	1995–1996	Serialized in Comic Tom; Published by Ushio Publishing in 1 volume	
Ao no Jidai (青青の時代)	1998–2000	Serialized in Comic Tom Plus; Published by Ushio Publishing in 4 volumes	
Hakuganshi (白眼子)	2000	Serialized in Comic Tom Plus; Published by Ushio Publishing in 1 volume	
Maihime Terpsichora (舞姫 テレプシコーラ)	2000–2006	Serialized in Da Vinci; Published by Media Factory in 10 volumes	
Maihime Terpsichora: Part 2 (舞姫 テレプシコーラ（第2部）)	2007–2010	Serialized in Da Vinci; Published by Media Factory in 5 volumes	
Wilis (ヴィリ)	2006–2007	Serialized in Da Vinci; Published by Media Factory in 1 volume	
Kesaran Pasaran (ケサラン・パサラン)	2011–2012	Serialized in Da Vinci; Published by Media Factory in 2 volumes	
Revelation: Keiji (レベレーション（啓示）)	2014–2020	Serialized in Morning; Published by Kodansha in 6 volumes Based on the life of Joan of Arc	

=== Selected one-shots ===
List of selected one-shot manga by Ryoko Yamagishi
Title	Year	Notes	Ref(s)
Left and Right (レフトアンドライト)	1969	Published in Ribon Comic; Debut work	
Shiroi Heya no Futari (白い部屋のふたり)	1971	Published in Ribon Comic; First manga to portray a lesbian relationship	
Ame to Cosmos (雨とコスモス)	1971	Published in Ribon	
Siren (セイレーン)	1977	Published in Hana to Yume	
Pupe Shimōnu (プぺ・シモーヌ)	1977	Published in Hana to Yume	
Harpy (ハーピー)	1978	Published in Petit Comic	
Kuro no Helen (黒のヘレネ―)	1979	Published in Hana to Yume; Based on the story of Helen of Troy	
Yasha Gozen (夜叉御前)	1982	Published in Petit Comic	
Hiruko (蛭子)	1985	Published in Petit Flower	

=== Art books ===
List of art books by Ryoko Yamagishi
No.	Title	Japanese release date	Japanese ISBN
1	Yamagishi Ryōko Gashū: Terasu (山岸凉子画集 光)	September 27, 2016	978-4-309-27755-4
Released in conjunction with Yamagishi's first full-scale art exhibition at the Yayoi Museum in Tokyo.
2	Yamagishi Ryōko Genga-shū: Kanaderu (山岸凉子原画集 奏)	March 2020	—
Released in celebration of Yamagishi's 50th anniversary as a manga artist. Includes 20 art reproductions, printed from high quality, color corrected scans of the originals, stored in a cloth-lined box.
