= Terpsichora =

Japanese manga series

- Fifth volume of Terpsichora Part 2

舞姫（テレプシコーラ） (Maihime Terepushikōra)
- Genre: Ballet, coming-of-age
- Manga
- Written by: Ryoko Yamagishi
- Published by: Media Factory
- Original run: June 23, 2001 – January 23, 2007
- Volumes: 10
- Manga

Terpsichora Part 2
- Written by: Ryoko Yamagishi
- Published by: Media Factory
- Original run: June 23, 2008 – October, 2010
- Volumes: 5

Terpsichora (Japanese: 舞姫（テレプシコーラ）, Hepburn: Maihime Terepushikōra; lit. 'The Dancing Girl'), also known as Maihime Τερψιχόρα in Greek, is a Japanese manga series written and illustrated by Ryoko Yamagishi. The manga was awarded the grand prize for the 11th Tezuka Osamu Cultural Prize in 2007. Media Factory published the 10 tankōbon volumes of the manga between June 23, 2001, and January 23, 2007.

Ryoko Yamagishi also wrote a sequel, titled Terpsichora Part 2 (舞姫（テレプシコーラ） 第2部, Maihime Terepushikōra Dai Ni Bu; lit. 'The Dancing Girl Part 2'). Media Factory has released the first tankōbon volume on July 23, 2008. Media Factory released the fourth volume of the manga on July 23, 2010. The second volume of Terpsichora Part 2 was ranked 10th on the Tohan charts between March 24–30, 2009. The fourth volume of Terpsichora Part 2 was ranked 18th and 19th on the Tohan charts between July 19, 2010, and August 1, 2010.
