= Comiket =

Doujinshi convention in Tokyo, Japan

Coordinates: 35°37′51″N 139°47′48″E

Comic Market コミックマーケット
- Status: Active
- Genre: Doujinshi convention
- Frequency: Semiannual
- Venue: Tokyo Big Sight in Ariake, Tokyo
- Inaugurated: 21 December 1975; 50 years ago
- Most recent: 15–16 August 2026
- Next event: 29–31 December 2026
- Attendance: 110,000 in December 2021 (Note: Attendance was capped at 55,000 people per day as a preventative health measure due to the COVID-19 pandemic; attendance at the most recent pre-COVID Comiket in December 2019 was 750,000.)
- Major events: Marketplace, industry floor, cosplay
- Organiser: Comic Market Preparatory Committee (ComiketPC)
- Website: comiket.co.jp/index_e.html (English) comiket.co.jp/ (Japanese)

Comic Market (コミックマーケット, Komikku Māketto), more commonly known as Comiket (コミケット, Komiketto) or Comike (コミケ, Komike), is a semiannual doujinshi convention in Tokyo, Japan. A grassroots market focused on the sale of doujin (self-published) works, Comiket is a not-for-profit fan convention administered by the volunteer-run Comic Market Preparatory Committee (ComiketPC). Inaugurated on 21 December 1975 with an estimated 700 attendees, Comiket has since grown to become the largest fan convention in the world, with an estimated turnstile attendance of 750,000 in 2019. Comiket is typically held at Tokyo Big Sight in August and December, with the two events distinguished as Summer Comic Market (夏コミ, Natsukomi) and Winter Comic Market (冬コミ, Fuyukomi), respectively.

== Program ==
=== Doujin marketplace ===
Comiket is focused primarily on the sale of doujin: non-commercial, self-published works. Approximately 35,000 circles (a term for groups or individuals who create doujin) participate in each edition of Comiket. Different circles exhibit on each day of Comiket; circles producing works on a common subject, such as a particular media franchise or manga genre, are typically grouped on the same day. The most common item sold at Comiket is doujinshi (self-published comics, novels or magazines), while a smaller number of circles sell doujin soft, analog (board/card/etc.) games, music, clothing, and other goods. These are often derivative fan works based on anime, video games, and other media, legal according to Japanese law (shinkokuzai). Since Comiket's inauguration, sample copies of all works sold at Comiket are collected and archived by ComiketPC, with over 2.1 million works having been archived.

==== Trends in derivative works ====
The number of doujin circles producing derivative works for given media properties, from Comiket 84 (August 2013) to Comiket 97 (December 2019).

=== Cosplay ===
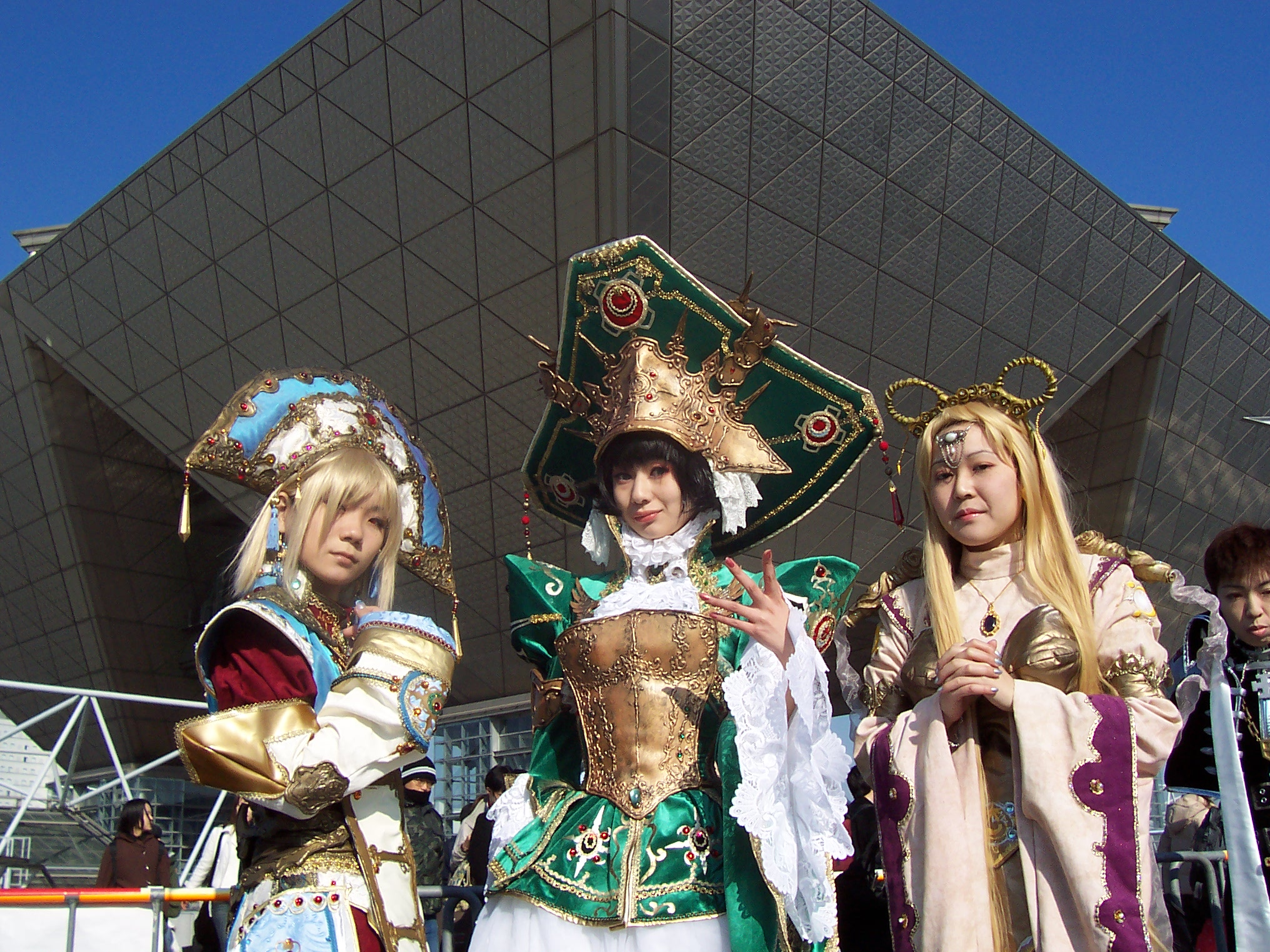
Elaborately dressed cosplayers at Comiket 69 in December 2005

Comiket is a major outlet for cosplay enthusiasts. Since Comiket 80 in 2011, restrictions on cosplaying have been gradually relaxed, with a shift from regulating objects (e.g. a ban on items that could be used as weapons) to regulating behavior (e.g. a ban on swinging around long objects). Some general contemporary guidelines include not wearing clothes that are too revealing, not imitating uniformed officers, and being out of cosplay when arriving/departing from Comiket.

=== Corporate booths ===
Comiket hosts 190 corporate booths each year. This includes both large commercial companies, such as video game studios and manga publishers, as well as celebrity meet and greet sessions.

== Operations ==
=== Schedule ===
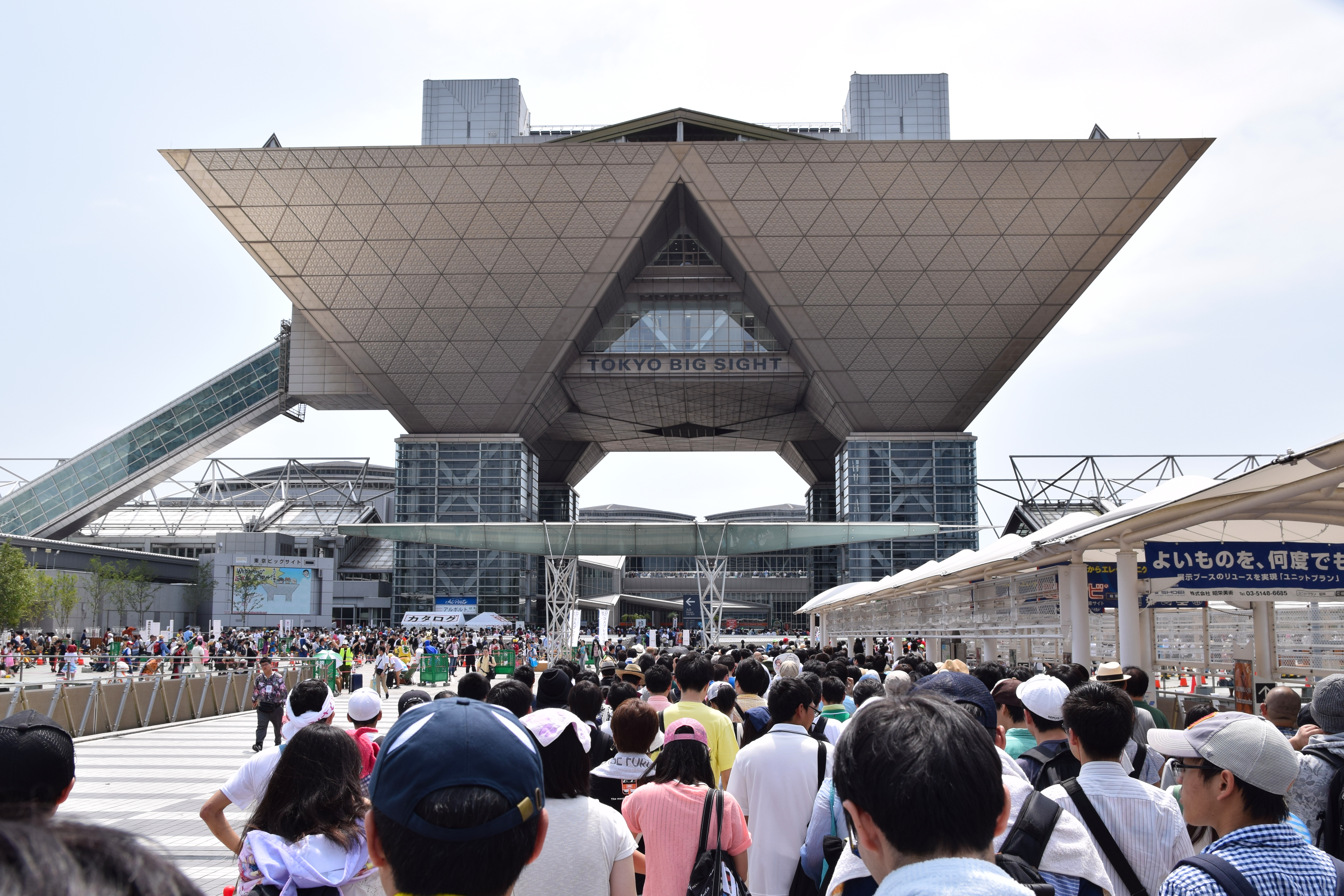
Entry queue to Comiket 90 in August 2016

Comiket is held twice yearly, in August and December. These events are distinguished as "Summer Comic Market" (Natsukomi) and "Winter Comic Market" (Fuyukomi). Since 1995, both events have run for three days each, with Summer Comiket generally occurring Friday to Sunday in mid-August, and Winter Comiket generally occurring the three days prior to New Year's Day. Starting with Comiket 96, the events have been four days long, with the exception of Comiket 103 and 104, which, due to the COVID-19 pandemic, were reduced to two days each. Both events run daily from 10:00 a.m. to 4:00 p.m, with corporate booths open until 5:00 p.m and the entire convention closing an hour early on the final day of the event. Comiket has been held at Tokyo Big Sight in Ariake, Tokyo since 1996. Comiket 98, which was planned for August 2020, was the event's first cancellation in its history as a result of the COVID-19 pandemic; Comiket 99, which would have been held in December 2020 was instead held in December 2021, two years after the last time it was held, and ran for only two days.

=== Event size ===
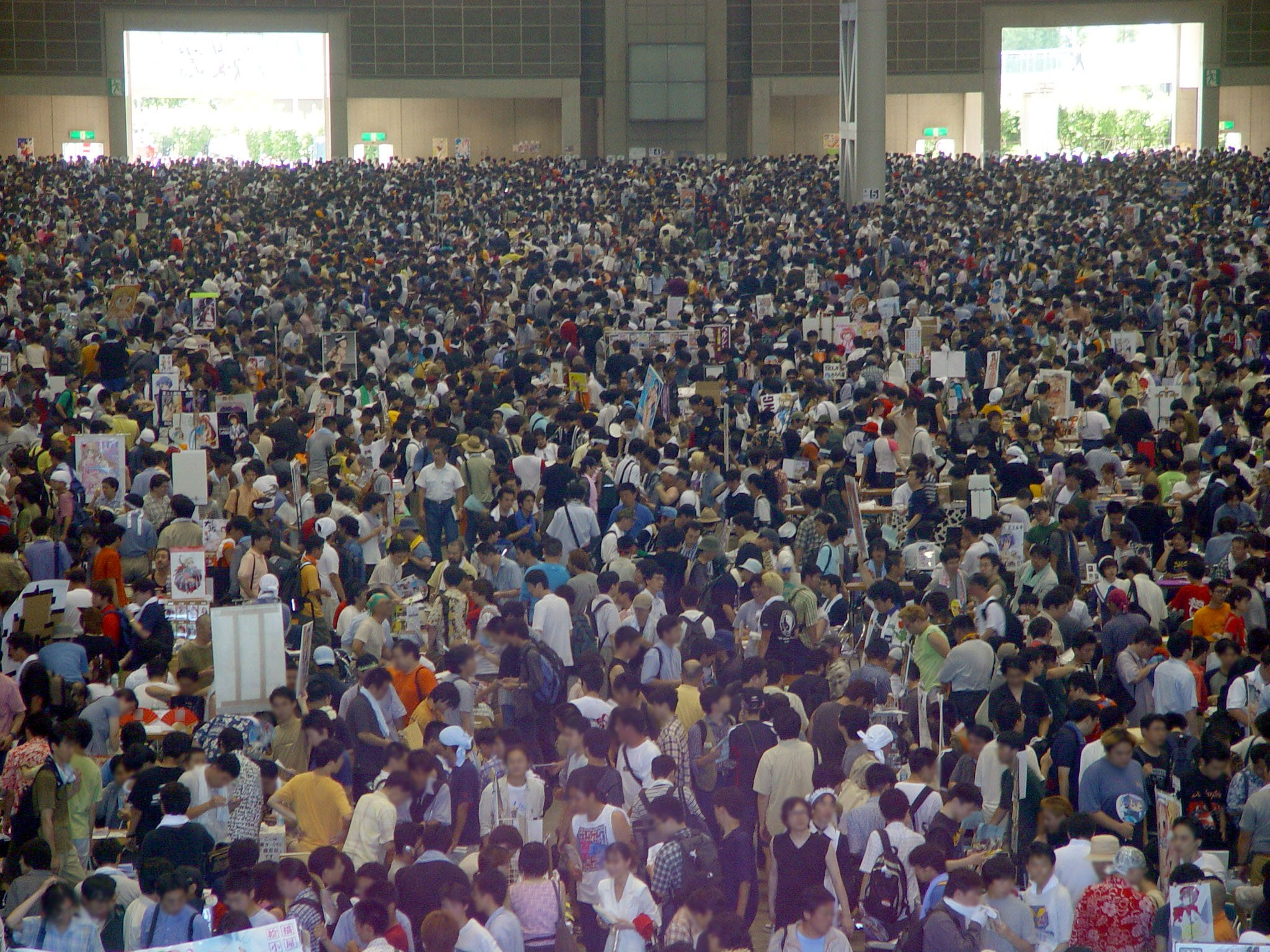
Crowds at Comiket 62 in August 2002

Comiket is the largest fan convention in the world, growing from fewer than 10,000 attendees in 1982 to over half a million by 2004. Since 2007, attendee numbers have fluctuated in the region of 500,000 for Winter Comiket and 560,000 for Summer Comiket. (Note: Attendance at Comiket 99 was capped at 55,000 people per day as a preventative health measure due to the COVID-19 pandemic.) Because of the extremely high volume of attendance at Comiket, mobile phone companies set up temporary antennas, while the Tokyo Metro makes special arrangements to accommodate the large crowds. Hour-long queues to enter Comiket during peak hours are common, while some attendees queue up to five hours before the event to ensure early admission. Popular circles are frequently placed near the venue's loading docks so that their queues can extend outside. ComiketPC recommends that first-time attendees arrive in the afternoon to avoid queues.

=== Catalog ===
For every Comiket, a catalog is released that contains information about the event. The catalog includes a list of all participating circles, maps of the convention layout, directions to and from the convention, rules for the convention, results from surveys held among Comiket participants, articles about topics relevant to dōjinshi creators, and one to two pictures ("circle cuts") for every participating circle. It is available in print and DVD-ROM format, and since Comiket 83, is available online behind a partial paywall.

Catalogs are made available for sale at stores two weeks before the event. The print version is roughly the size of an average phone book, while the DVD-ROM version includes features such as advanced search functions and a clickable map. To date, there is no English edition of the catalog available, though the catalog does contain a four-page basic guide for attending Comiket in English, Chinese, and Korean.

Prior to Comiket 96, a purchased catalog was not required for admission to Comiket (see 2020 Summer Olympics changes below).

=== Participants ===
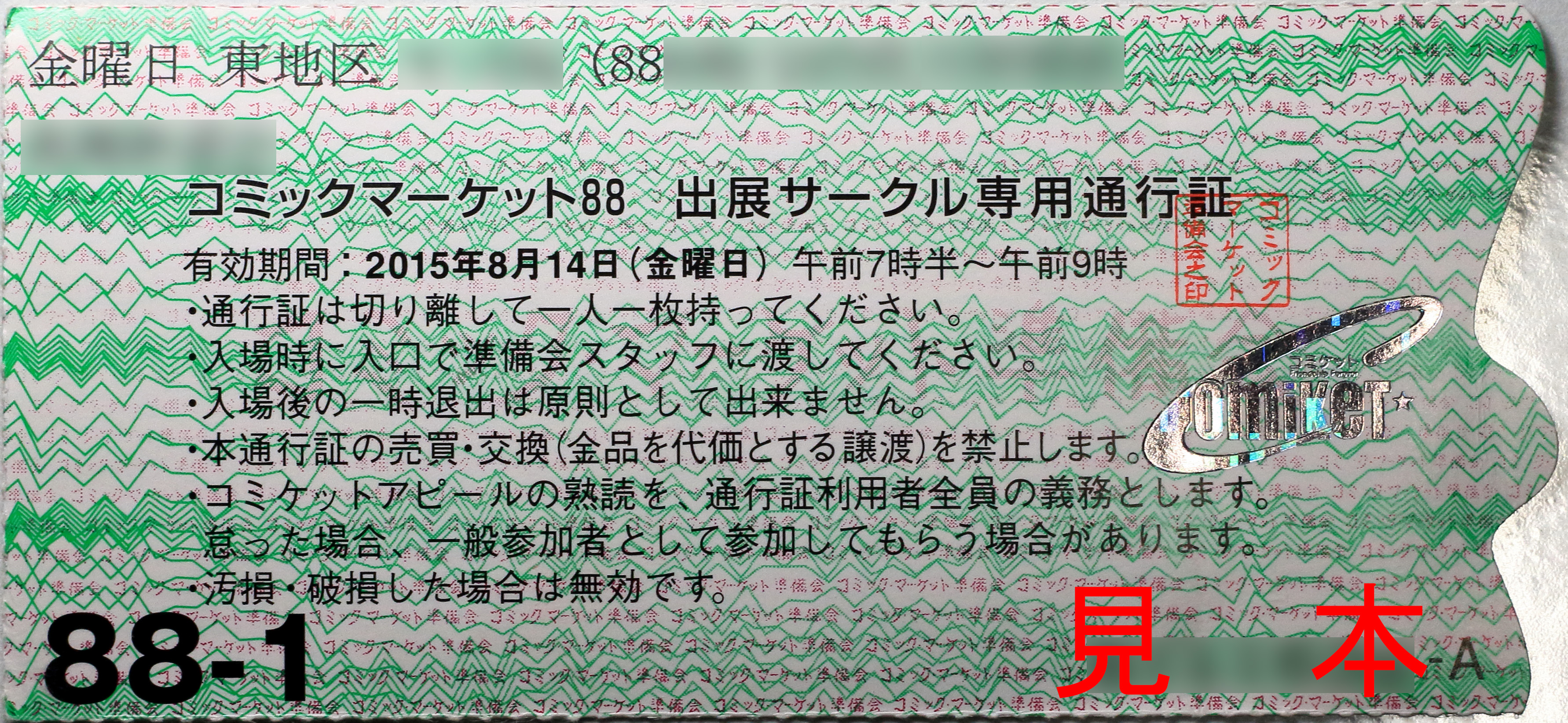
A circle ticket for Comiket 88. The ticket uses holography to prevent counterfeiting and includes the personal information of the exhibitor (blurred in this image) to prevent scalping.

The overwhelming majority of Comiket circle participants are amateur and hobbyist artists: 70% of participating circles lose money, while only 15% turn a profit. The majority of circle participants at Comiket are female, with women composing 57% of participating circles at Comiket 84. General attendees at Comiket tend to skew male, with men comprising 64% of attendees at Comiket 78.

Of the Comiket circle participants, a 2011 poll showed that nearly half participated because attending the event and showing off their work is enjoyable, and a significant percentage came to spread their works to the public. A smaller percentage of dōjinshi creators' goal is to promote an idea or opinion through attending Comiket.

The majority of those participating in circles in 2010 said that they are a part of a one-person circle (59%), while two-person (20%) and three-person (8%) circles were also common.

=== Philanthropy ===
Since 1993, ComiketPC has donated over ¥60 million to sustainable forest management to offset paper used in the production of dōjinshi. Since 2007, ComiketPC has worked with the Japanese Red Cross Society to organize bloodmobiles at Comiket events, with donors given Comiket-exclusive posters depicting characters from anime and video games. The Red Cross receives an estimated 1,500 blood donations at each Comiket.

== History ==
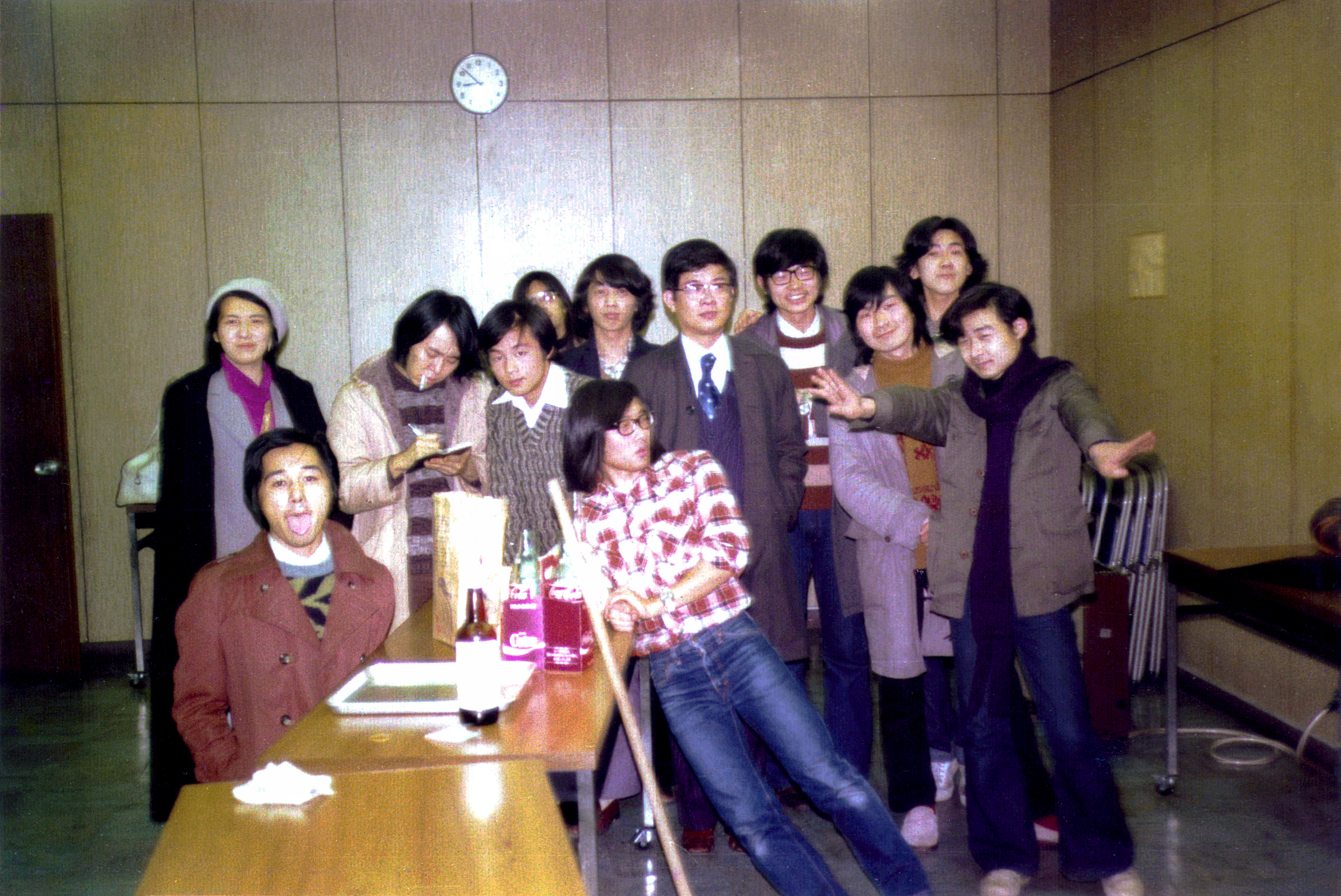
Meikyu, a manga critique circle that founded the Comiket

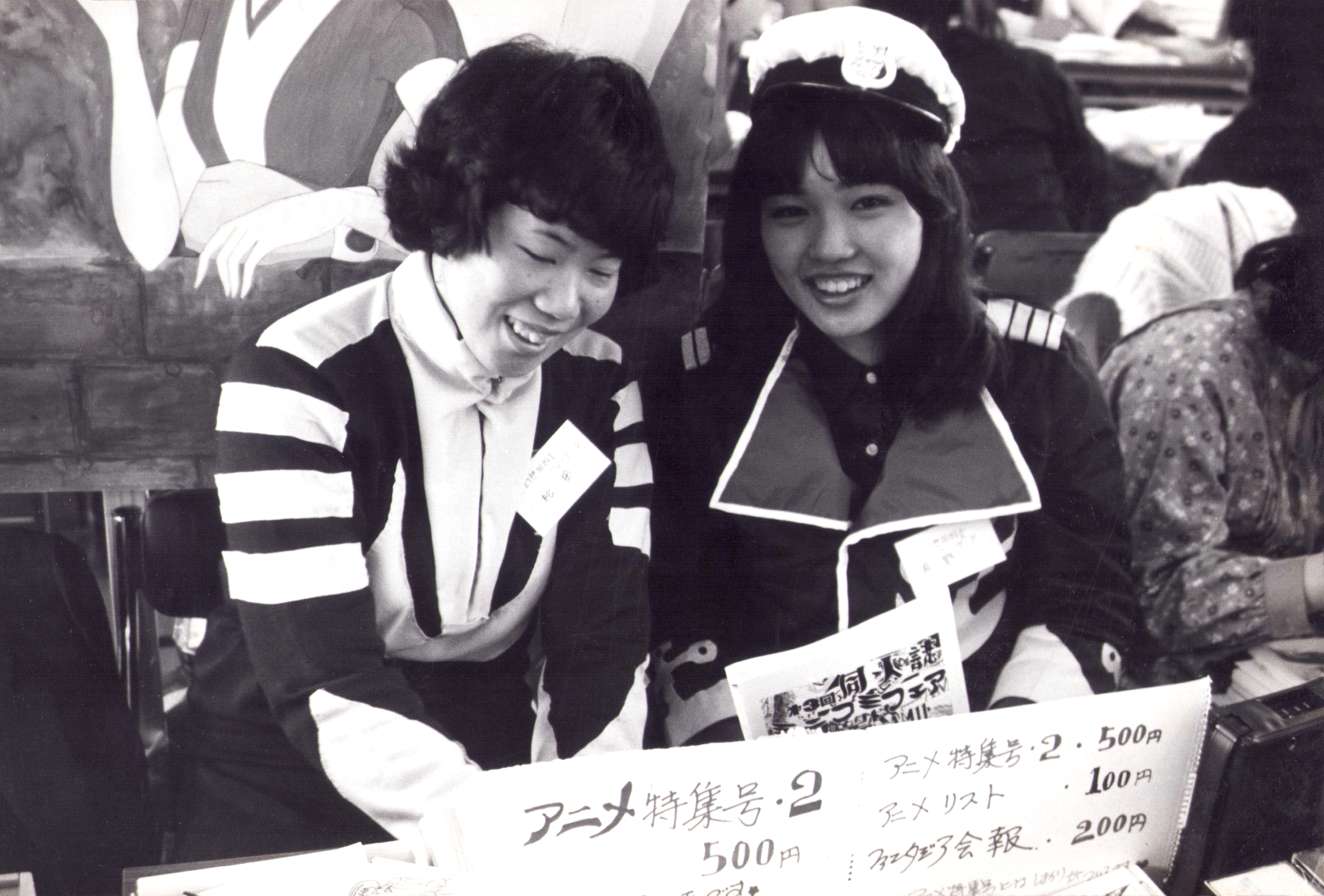
Space Battleship Yamato's Cosplay at Comiket 8, held in April 1978 at Ōta City Industrial Building

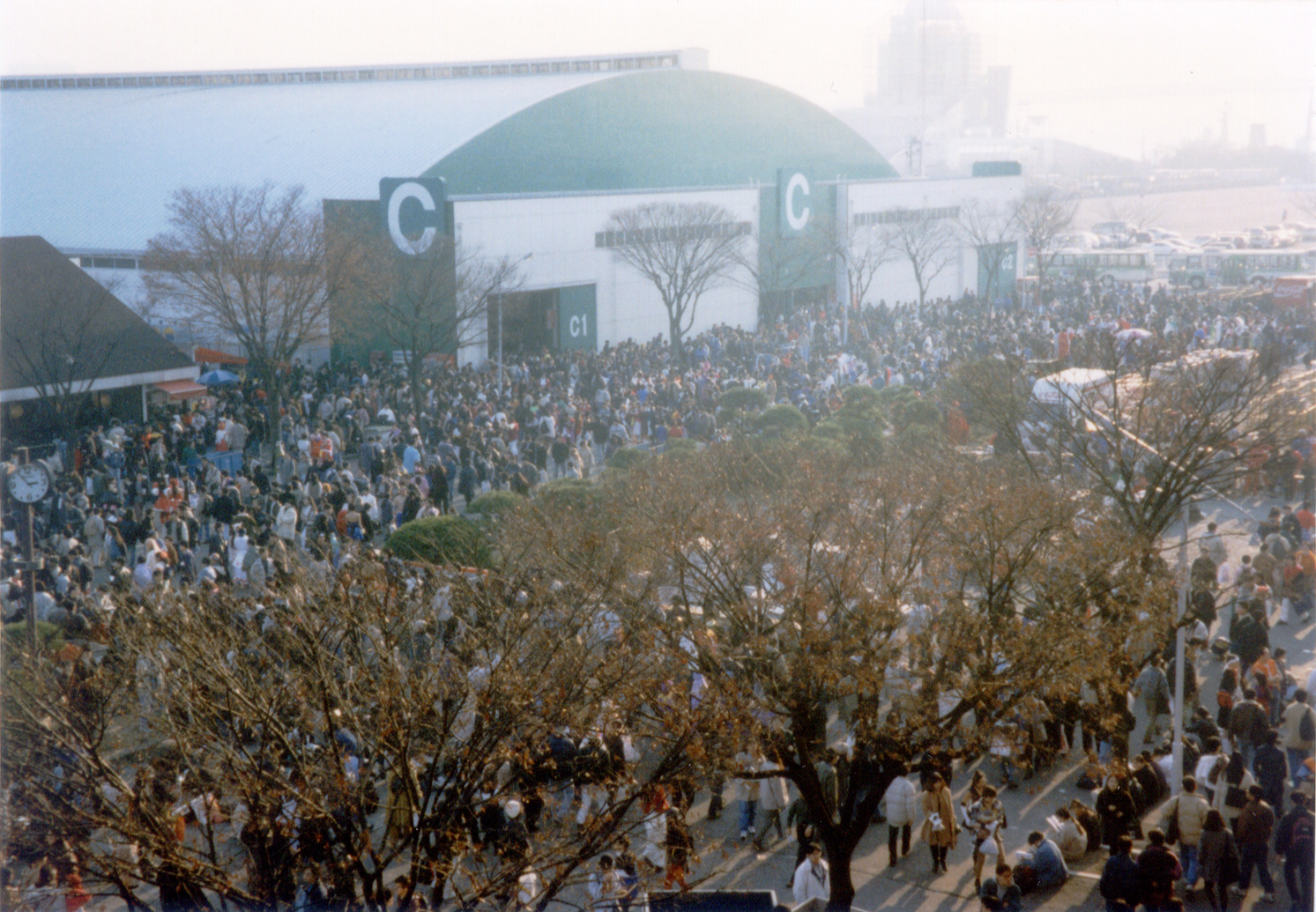
Crowds at Comiket 49, held in December 1995 at Harumi Fairgrounds

Comiket was inaugurated in 1975 by Meikyu (Labyrinth), a dōjin circle founded by Yoshihiro Yonezawa, Teruo Harada, and Jun Aniwa while studying at Meiji University. The first Comiket was organized amid a period of immense change and upheaval for manga as a medium, characterized by the closure of the experimental manga magazine COM and the ascendance of the Year 24 Group. A 1975 incident in which a dōjin creator applying for Nihon Manga Taikai was refused admission after criticizing the convention's focus on professional guests over dōjin creators in her application became a catalyst for the founding of Comiket as a fan convention.

As Comiket grew, a lottery system to allocate exhibition space was implemented in 1979, as the number of applications from circles began to surpass available space. In 1981 the event moved to Harumi Fairgrounds and began publishing an event catalog in 1982. Comiket would change locations frequently throughout the late 1980s and 1990s, as the Japanese bubble economy led to an upsurge in trade shows that made it difficult to secure a consistent venue. The murders by Tsutomu Miyazaki and subsequent moral panic against otaku would lead to further difficulties in Comiket's ability to secure a venue. Tokyo Big Sight hosted Comiket for the first time in 1996, and remains the convention's primary venue. In 1998 (C54), an arsonist placed incendiary devices in the venue the day before the event, which were noticed and neutralized with no major damage; the event was held as normal, though with heightened security. The arsonist was caught at the following event.

In 2012, anonymous threats made against circles creating works related to Kuroko's Basketball led Comiket to prohibit the sale of all Kuroko's Basketball-related items at Comiket 85 (see Kuroko's Basketball § Controversies). Organizers refunded the registration fees for the roughly 900 circles producing Kuroko's Basketball items, resulting in a loss for Comiket of roughly ¥10 million. In 2015, ComiketPC organized a special event specifically focused on doujinshi related to the series. Affectionately nicknamed "Kuroket", the event hosted approximately 2,400 circles producing Kuroko's Basketball items.

In August 2018, ComiketPC announced modified schedules for Comikets 96, 97, and 98 due to the 2020 Summer Olympics. As the east wing of Big Sight closed in 2019 for renovations in advance of the Olympics, the corporate booths of C96 and C97 were moved to Aomi Exhibition Hall, and both events expanded to four days of programming. Admission to both events required the purchase of a wristband – the first time in Comiket's history it was not free to attend – in order to offset the cost of running the event across four days, and to depress attendance in light of the smaller venue space. Wristbands for all four days were included with the purchase of a print event catalog, while individual wristbands for each day were available to purchase at Big Sight the day of the event. C98 in 2020 was slated to be moved to Golden Week in May in order to not conflict with the Olympics in August. On 27 March 2020, ComiketPC announced that C98 had been cancelled due to the COVID-19 pandemic, making it the first time a Comiket event has been cancelled. On 12 July 2020, it was announced that Comiket 99 would be postponed to 2021, taking place during Golden Week as C98 would have in order to not conflict with the Summer Olympics, which were also postponed. A virtual event titled "Air Comiket" was held in December to replace its originally planned dates. Comic Market 99 was ultimately delayed to December 2021, and ran for only two days with entry limited to 55,000 people per day by requiring ticket purchases.

=== Event history ===
| No. | Year | Date | Dōjin circles | Attendance (Note: Comiket records attendance as the sum total of attendees on each day of the event, and does not account for repeat attendees across multiple days.) | Venues |
|---|---|---|---|---|---|
| 1 | 1975 | 21 December | 32 | 700 | Nissho Hall |
| 2 | 1976 | 4 April | 39 | 550 | Itabashi Industrial Union Building (板橋産業連合会館) |
| 3 | 1976 | 25 July | 56 | 500 | Itabashi Industrial Union Building (板橋産業連合会館) |
| 4 | 1976 | 19 December | 80 | 700 | Itabashi Industrial Union Building (板橋産業連合会館) |
| 5 | 1977 | 10 April | 94 | 1,300 | Ōta City Industrial Building (大田区産業会館) |
| 6 | 1977 | 30–31 July (Note: First ever two-day Comiket.) | 100 | 2,000 | Ōta City Industrial Building (大田区産業会館) |
| 7 | 1977 | 18 December | 131 | 2,500 | Ōta City Industrial Building (大田区産業会館) |
| 8 | 1978 | 2 April | 144 | 2,000 | Ōta City Industrial Building (大田区産業会館) |
| CS1 (Note: Held as the first "Comiket Special" (コミケスペシャル).) | 1978 | 6 May | Unknown | 250 | Yotsuya Public Hall (四谷公会堂) |
| 9 | 1978 | 29–30 July | 200 | 3,000 | Yotsuya Public Hall (四谷公会堂) |
| — (Note: Held as the "Comic Market in Ikkyosai" (コミックマーケットin一橋祭).) | 1978 | 15 November | Unknown | Unknown | Hitotsubashi University Kunitachi Campus |
| 10 | 1978 | 17 December | 200 | 3,000 | Ōta City Industrial Building |
| 11 | 1979 | 8 April | 218 | 3,000 | Ōta City Industrial Building |
| 12 | 1979 | 28–29 July | 330 | 4,000 | Tokyo Metropolitan Industrial Trade Center |
| 13 | 1979 | 23 December | 290 | 4,000 | Ōta City Industrial Building |
| 14 | 1980 | 11 May | 380 | 6,000 | Kawasaki Shimin Plaza (川崎市民プラザ) |
| 15 | 1980 | 14 September | 340 | 7,000 | Kawasaki Shimin Plaza (川崎市民プラザ) |
| 16 | 1980 | 14 December | 340 | 7,000 | Kawasaki Shimin Plaza (川崎市民プラザ) |
| 17 | 1981 | 5 April | 400 | 8,000 | Kawasaki Shimin Plaza (川崎市民プラザ) |
| 18 | 1981 | 15–16 August | 512 | 10,000 | Yokohama Sanbo Hall |
| 19 | 1981 | 20 December | 600 | 9,000 | Harumi Fairgrounds |
| 20 | 1982 | 21 March | 780 | 9,000 | Harumi Fairgrounds |
| 21 | 1982 | 8 August | 970 | 10,000 | Harumi Fairgrounds |
| 22 | 1982 | 26 December | 1,060 | 8,000 | Harumi Fairgrounds |
| 23 (Note: The final annual spring event.) | 1983 | 3 April | 1,200 | 13,000 | Harumi Fairgrounds |
| 24 | 1983 | 7 August | 1,500 | 18,000 | Harumi Fairgrounds |
| 25 | 1983 | 25 December | 1,550 | 25,000 | Harumi Fairgrounds |
| 26 | 1984 | 19 August | 2,400 | 30,000 | Harumi Fairgrounds |
| 27 | 1984 | 23 December | 2,300 | 25,000 | Harumi Fairgrounds |
| 28 | 1985 | 11 August | 3,450 | 30,000 | Harumi Fairgrounds |
| 29 | 1985 | 29 December | 4,000 | 30,000 | Harumi Fairgrounds |
| 30 | 1986 | 10 August | 3,900 | 35,000 | Harumi Fairgrounds |
| 31 | 1986 | 27–28 December | 4,400 | 40,000 | Tokyo Ryutsu Center |
| 32 | 1987 | 8–9 August | 4,400 | 60,000 | Tokyo Ryutsu Center |
| 33 | 1987 | 26–27 December | 4,400 | 55,000 | Tokyo Ryutsu Center |
| 34 | 1988 | 13–14 August | 9,200 | 70,000 | Harumi Fairgrounds |
| 35 | 1989 | 25–26 March | 8,900 | 70,000 | Harumi Fairgrounds |
| 36 | 1989 | 13–14 August | 10,000 | 100,000 | Harumi Fairgrounds |
| 37 | 1989 | 23–24 December | 11,000 | 120,000 | Makuhari Messe |
| 38 | 1990 | 18–19 August | 13,000 | 230,000 | Makuhari Messe |
| 39 | 1990 | 23–24 December | 13,000 | 250,000 | Makuhari Messe |
| 40 | 1991 | 16–17 August | 11,000 | 200,000 | Harumi Fairgrounds |
| 41 | 1991 | 29–30 December | 14,000 | 200,000 | Harumi Fairgrounds |
| 42 | 1992 | 15–16 August | 12,000 | 250,000 | Harumi Fairgrounds |
| 43 | 1992 | 29–30 December | 15,000 | 180,000 | Harumi Fairgrounds |
| 44 | 1993 | 15–16 August | 15,000 | 250,000 | Harumi Fairgrounds |
| 45 | 1993 | 29–30 December | 16,000 | 200,000 | Harumi Fairgrounds |
| 46 | 1994 | 7–8 August | 16,000 | 240,000 | Harumi Fairgrounds |
| 47 | 1994 | 29–30 December | 16,000 | 200,000 | Harumi Fairgrounds |
| 48 | 1995 | 18–20 August (Note: First ever three-day Comiket.) | 22,000 | 250,000 | Harumi Fairgrounds |
| 49 | 1995 | 29–30 December | 16,000 | 220,000 | Harumi Fairgrounds |
| CS2 (Note: Held as the "Farewell Harumi!! Comiket Special" (さよなら晴海!!コミケットスペシャル).) | 1996 | 17 March | 1,300 | 8,000 | Harumi Fairgrounds |
| 50 | 1996 | 3–4 August | 18,000 | 350,000 | Tokyo Big Sight |
| 51 | 1996 | 28–29 December | 22,000 | 220,000 | Tokyo Big Sight |
| 52 | 1997 | 15–17 August | 33,000 | 400,000 | Tokyo Big Sight |
| 53 | 1997 | 28–29 December | 22,000 | 300,000 | Tokyo Big Sight |
| 54 | 1998 | 14–16 August | 33,000 | 380,000 | Tokyo Big Sight |
| 55 | 1998 | 29–30 December | 23,000 | 300,000 | Tokyo Big Sight |
| 56 | 1999 | 13–15 August | 35,000 | 400,000 | Tokyo Big Sight |
| 57 | 1999 | 24–26 December | 25,000 | 320,000 | Tokyo Big Sight |
| CS3 (Note: Held as the "Resort Comiket in Okinawa. Comiket Special 3" (リゾコミin沖縄コミケットスペシャル3).) | 2000 | 13–15 August | 200 | 1,500 | Okinawa Convention Center |
| 58 | 2000 | 11–13 August | 35,000 | 430,000 | Tokyo Big Sight |
| 59 | 2000 | 29–30 December | 23,000 | 300,000 | Tokyo Big Sight |
| 60 | 2001 | 10–12 August | 35,000 | 480,000 | Tokyo Big Sight |
| 61 | 2001 | 29–31 December | 23,000 | 360,000 | Tokyo Big Sight |
| 62 | 2002 | 9–11 August | 35,000 | 480,000 | Tokyo Big Sight |
| 63 | 2002 | 28–30 December | 35,000 | 450,000 | Tokyo Big Sight |
| 64 | 2003 | 15–17 August | 35,000 | 460,000 | Tokyo Big Sight |
| 65 | 2003 | 28–30 December | 35,000 | 420,000 | Tokyo Big Sight |
| 66 | 2004 | 15–17 August | 35,000 | 510,000 | Tokyo Big Sight |
| 67 | 2004 | 28–30 December | 23,000 | 370,000 | Tokyo Big Sight |
| CS4 (Note: Held as the "30th Anniversary 24 Hours (!?) of Comiket Special 4" (30周年記念24耐(!?)コミケットスペシャル4).) | 2005 | 21 March | 3,400 | 50,000 | Tokyo Big Sight |
| 68 | 2005 | 12–14 August | 35,000 | 480,000 | Tokyo Big Sight |
| 69 | 2005 | 29–30 December | 23,000 | 350,000 | Tokyo Big Sight |
| 70 | 2006 | 11–13 August | 35,000 | 430,000 | Tokyo Big Sight |
| 71 | 2006 | 29–31 December (Note: First Comiket held during Ōmisoka.) | 35,000 | 440,000 | Tokyo Big Sight |
| 72 | 2007 | 17–19 August | 35,000 | 550,000 | Tokyo Big Sight |
| 73 | 2007 | 29–31 December | 35,000 | 500,000 | Tokyo Big Sight |
| 74 | 2008 | 15–17 August | 35,000 | 550,000 | Tokyo Big Sight |
| 75 | 2008 | 28–30 December | 35,000 | 510,000 | Tokyo Big Sight |
| 76 | 2009 | 14–16 August | 35,000 | 560,000 | Tokyo Big Sight |
| 77 | 2009 | 29–31 December | 35,000 | 510,000 | Tokyo Big Sight |
| CS5 (Note: Held as the "Comiket Special 5 in Mito" (コみケッとスペシャル5 in 水戸).) | 2010 | 14–16 August | 1,500 | 33,000 | Isejin Izumi-cho Kita Building (伊勢甚泉町北ビル) |
| 78 | 2010 | 13–15 August | 35,000 | 560,000 | Tokyo Big Sight |
| 79 | 2010 | 29–31 December | 35,000 | 520,000 | Tokyo Big Sight |
| 80 | 2011 | 12–14 August | 35,000 | 540,000 | Tokyo Big Sight |
| 81 | 2011 | 29–31 December | 35,000 | 500,000 | Tokyo Big Sight |
| 82 | 2012 | 10–12 August | 35,000 | 560,000 | Tokyo Big Sight |
| 83 | 2012 | 29–31 December | 35,000 | 550,000 | Tokyo Big Sight |
| 84 | 2013 | 10–12 August | 35,000 | 590,000 | Tokyo Big Sight |
| 85 | 2013 | 29–31 December | 35,000 | 520,000 | Tokyo Big Sight |
| 86 | 2014 | 15–17 August | 35,000 | 550,000 | Tokyo Big Sight |
| 87 | 2014 | 28–30 December | 35,000 | 560,000 | Tokyo Big Sight |
| CS6 (Note: Held as the "Comiket Special 6 Otaku Summit 2015" (コミケットスペシャル6 OTAKU SUMMIT 2015).) | 2015 | 28–29 March | 5,200 | 50,000 | Makuhari Messe |
| 88 | 2015 | 14–16 August | 35,000 | 550,000 | Tokyo Big Sight |
| 89 | 2015 | 29–31 December | 35,000 | 520,000 | Tokyo Big Sight |
| 90 | 2016 | 12–14 August | 34,000 | 530,000 | Tokyo Big Sight |
| 91 | 2016 | 29–31 December | 36,000 | 550,000 | Tokyo Big Sight |
| 92 | 2017 | 11–13 August | 32,000 | 500,000 | Tokyo Big Sight |
| 93 | 2017 | 29–31 December | 32,000 | 550,000 | Tokyo Big Sight |
| 94 | 2018 | 10–12 August | 35,000 | 530,000 | Tokyo Big Sight |
| 95 | 2018 | 29–31 December | 35,000 | 570,000 | Tokyo Big Sight |
| 96 | 2019 | 9–12 August (Note: First ever four-day Comiket.) | 32,000 | 730,000 | Tokyo Big Sight & Aomi Exhibition Hall |
| 97 | 2019 | 28–31 December | 32,000 | 750,000 | Tokyo Big Sight & Aomi Exhibition Hall |
| 98 | 2020 | Cancelled (Note: Scheduled for 2–5 May 2020; cancelled due to the COVID-19 pandemic. First ever Comiket event to be cancelled.) | —N/a | —N/a | —N/a |
| 99 | 2021 | 30–31 December (Note: Scheduled for 28–31 December 2020; postponed twice (first to 2–5 May 2021, then to 30–31 December 2021) due to the COVID-19 pandemic.) | 20,000 | 110,000 | Tokyo Big Sight |
| 100 | 2022 | 13–14 August | 20,000 | 170,000 | Tokyo Big Sight |
| 101 | 2022 | 30–31 December | 20,000 | 180,000 | Tokyo Big Sight |
| 102 | 2023 | 12–13 August | 21,000 | 260,000 | Tokyo Big Sight |
| 103 | 2023 | 30–31 December | 25,900 | 270,000 | Tokyo Big Sight |
| 104 | 2024 | 11–12 August | 24,000 | 260,000 | Tokyo Big Sight |
| 105 | 2024 | 29–30 December | 29,000 | 300,000 | Tokyo Big Sight |
| 106 | 2025 | 16–17 August | 23,000 | 250,000 | Tokyo Big Sight |
| 107 | 2025 | 30–31 December | 23,700 | 300,000 | Tokyo Big Sight |
| 108 | 2026 | August | TBA | TBA | TBA |
| 109 | 2026 | December | TBA | TBA | TBA |
| 110 | 2027 | August | TBA | TBA | TBA |
| 111 | 2027 | December | TBA | TBA | TBA |

== See also ==
- Lucca Comics & Games, the largest comics festival in Europe, and the second biggest in the world after the Comiket
- Comic World, an anime and doujin festival with events in South Korea, Hong Kong, and Taiwan
- Comifuro, a doujin convention in Indonesia.
- Anime Expo, an anime convention in Los Angeles, California
- Japan Expo, a Japanese pop culture convention in France
- Overload, a doujin festival in New Zealand
- Comica Comiket, a one-day small-press and minicomics market held in conjunction with Comica, the London International Comics Festival (2007–2016)
