= Overload (convention) =

Anime convention in New Zealand

- 15th anniversary event logo in 2021, with the convention's mascot Nindoro-kun
- Status: Active
- Genre: Anime; Manga
- Venue: New Zealand International Convention Centre (NZICC)
- Locations: Auckland, New Zealand
- Country: New Zealand
- Inaugurated: 2006
- Attendance: 8000+ in 2025
- Organizer: Overload Committee
- Website: overload.co.nz

Overload, also known as Overload NZ (formerly Doujin Overload), is an annual two-day anime convention focusing on doujin, Japanese pop culture, exhibitors and artists held in Auckland, New Zealand. It is the first of its kind to run in New Zealand, and is considered the country's biggest anime and manga-focused convention. Overload was regularly hosted at The Cloud starting in 2016, acquired additional use of Shed 10 on Queens Wharf in 2024, and moved to the New Zealand International Convention Centre (NZICC) in 2026 coinciding with the event's 20th anniversary.

== Origins ==
Overload (the Doujin Overload) was founded in 2006 by Seong Oh, who opened the Graphic Novel Cafe store in 2002, an Auckland outlet specializing in English-language manga and anime merchandise. The event was set up based on conversations in the Auckland doujin community about helping local artists showcase and sell their work, specifically inspired by the Comiket in Japan.

The first Overload convention took place on 9 July 2006 at the Mercure Hotel on Queen Street, with 30 artists and 150 attendees.

== Programming ==
Overload previously ran as a single-day event every year apart from 2011 when it took place over two days. In 2023, the convention became an annual two-day event. Aside from the sale of artists' work, it includes comic and art competitions (since 2012), an art exhibition (since 2012) also featuring pieces from users of the Japanese art sharing website Pixiv, and a cosplay competition (since 2010).

Overload has added events to its schedule such as live performances, skits, and Q&A panels on its main stage. There is an itasha display of cars decorated with anime-themed artwork, a collaborative wall where attendees can draw their own interpretations of the Vocaloid character Hatsune Miku, a mobile library with manga provided by Auckland Libraries, and a cosplay café offering both reservation and take-out options. An arts and crafts area features hands-on activities including life drawing sessions with cosplayers, origami and calligraphy, live commissions, and an anime tattoo zone.

== History ==
Overload has become more diverse in recent years following the dropping of "Doujin" from the convention's name, with a focus on wider comic work from 2011 on. Additional events have included the 2011 Game Development panel, and the 2012 art exhibition at Unitec Snow White Gallery of Japanese anime artist Fuzichoco. The event is notable for early support of cos-players from 2008 on. In 2011, former World Cosplay Champion Yuri Inaba was an invited participant of Overload.

In 2022, Overload held an exhibition featuring production art from the Evangelion series, supported by Groundworks Co., Ltd. and Bandai Namco Asia. In 2023, the convention hosted an art exhibition showcasing the anime works of Studio Trigger, such as key background and concept art from Kill la Kill, Little Witch Academia and Cyberpunk: Edgerunners, supported and approved by Studio Trigger.

Notable international guests have included Junji Ito, creator of Tomie and Uzumaki; Paru Itagaki, creator of Beastars; Masahiko Ōtsuka and Hiroyuki Imaishi, directors from Gainax and founders of Studio Trigger. Autographed shikishi from guests and original drawings from mangaka who have attended previous Overload events are framed and displayed at the Graphic Novel Cafe in Auckland.

In 2025, Overload saw participation from more than 500 artists and over 8000 attendees. Stalls range from creatives and retailers within New Zealand, those from Australia, and other overseas collaborators.

On 27 September 2026, Overload's second day coincided with the campaign launch of the New Zealand National Party at the New Zealand International Convention Centre (NZICC). At the venue, 1News interviewed several attendees and cosplayers regarding the upcoming general election.

=== Event History ===
Year	Dates	Venue	Attendance	Featured Artists & Guests
2006	9 July	Mercure Hotel	150	Ethird (Simon Kao)
2007	8 July	The Hyatt Auckland		Jianran Pan & W.L.Wong
2008	8 July	The Hyatt Auckland		Ethird (Simon Kao)
2009	26 July	Mercure Hotel		Paolo Alinea
2010	25 July	The Hyatt Auckland	1000	Jeremiah W. & Anthony Lau
2011	26–27 July	The Hyatt Auckland	800	Eddie & SnowWaltz
2012	22 September	The Pullman Hotel	600	Fuzichoco
2013	28 September	ASB Stadium	1600 (approx)	Range Murata
2014	4 October	ASB Stadium	2000 (approx)	Yoshitoshi ABe
2015	26 September	ASB Stadium		Noizi Ito, Yuegene Fay
2016	24 September	The Cloud		Yun Kōga, Reika (cosplay), A.K.Wirru
2017	30 September	The Cloud		Takuya Satō, Marina Kawano, Ying Tze (cosplay)
2018	24 September	The Cloud		Hiromi Igarashi, Seiji Mizushima, KANAME (cosplay)
2019	28 September	The Cloud		Junji Ito, Kurumi Purarine
2021	24 April	The Cloud		Hiroyuki Asada, Alisa, Guillaume Devigne (Crypton Future Media)
2022	8 October	The Cloud		Ai Kakuma, Hiroyuki Asada
2023	15-16 April	The Cloud		Masahiko Ōtsuka and Hiroyuki Imaishi (Studio Trigger), Namihei Koshige, Vye (cosplay), CyYu
2024	20-21 April	The Cloud, Shed 10	8000+	Paru Itagaki, Setsuo Itō, SUOL, Shinnosuke Uchida, Thames (cosplay)
2025	26-27 April	The Cloud, Shed 10	8000+	Yūki Kuwahara, Ilya Kuvshinov, Aki Irie, Kaoru Mori, Yosuke (cosplay), Wendy Martin, Acky Bright
2026	26-27 September	New Zealand International Convention Centre (NZICC)	TBA	Ladybeard, Kugane Maruyama, Yuji Koi (cosplay), mit Photography, memoh., Chelsey Furedi, DOYAK, ORKA, Akiko Fujita, Kazufumi Kikushima, Hyuganatsu

== See also ==
- Armageddon Expo, New Zealand's largest pop culture convention with a focus on anime, holding two annual events in Auckland at Auckland Showgrounds
