= Karate Master =

Japanese manga and anime series

- Volume one cover art

空手バカ一代 (Karate Baka Ichidai)
- Genre: Martial Arts; Action
- Manga
- Written by: Ikki Kajiwara
- Illustrated by: Jirō Tsunoda (vol. 1–11); Jōya Kagemaru (vol. 12–29)
- Published by: Kodansha
- Magazine: Weekly Shōnen Magazine
- Original run: 1971 – 1977
- Volumes: 29
- Anime television series
- Directed by: Eiji Okabe and Osamu Dezaki
- Produced by: Eisuke Nozawa; Nobuo Inada
- Studio: A Production; Tokyo Movie
- Licensed by: NA: Discotek Media
- Original network: ANN (NET)
- Original run: October 3, 1973 – September 25, 1974
- Episodes: 47
- Live-action film
- Directed by: Kazuhiko Yamaguchi
- Studio: Toei
- Released: 14 May 1977
- Runtime: 91 minutes
- icon

Karate Master (空手バカ一代, Karate Baka Ichidai; lit. 'A Karate-Crazy Life') is a Japanese manga drawn by Jirō Tsunoda and Jōya Kagemaru, with the story written by Ikki Kajiwara. The story was inspired by the life of the real-life karate martial artist Mas Oyama.

The manga was published in Weekly Shōnen Magazine between 1971 and 1977, and accumulated in 29 tankōbon volumes. It was adapted into an anime television series from 1973 to 1974, and a live-action film in 1977.

== Anime and film adaptations ==
The anime television series was produced by Tokyo Movie and aired Wednesdays, from 19:30 to 20:00, on NET from October 3, 1973, to September 25, 1974, totaling 47 episodes.

The manga was first adapted into a live-action film by Toei as Karate Baka Ichidai, which was released on 14 May 1977 (the English release title was Karate for Life). It was directed by Kazuhiko Yamaguchi and starred Shin'ichi ("Sonny") Chiba. The two-part film, Shin Karate Baka Ichidai: Kakutōsha, which was directed by Takeshi Miyasaka and released in 2003 and 2004 to commemorate the seventeenth anniversary of Kajiwara's death, is often treated as an adaptation of the manga, but its direct source is a book by Hisao Maki, Kajiwara's younger brother.

The anime is now available on Hulu (in the U.S.) under the name Karate Master. Discotek Media has licensed the anime for home video release in North America.

== Reception and legacy ==
The success of the manga and the anime are often credited for producing a "karate boom" in Japan in the early 1970s.

Video game artist Keiji Inafune drew inspiration from Karate Master for several character designs in the arcade fighting game Street Fighter (1987).
