= Jirō Tsunoda =

Japanese manga artist (born 1936)

Jirō Tsunoda (Japanese: つのだじろう Tsunoda Jirō, born 3 July 1936) is a Japanese manga artist. He is known in Japan for his horror manga series such as Kyōfu Shinbun and Ushiro no Hyakutarō as well as illustrator of the karate series Karate Master.

== Life ==
Tsunoda was born in Tokyo. He is the second of eight brothers. One of his younger brothers, Hiro Tsunoda, is a pop musician. He published his first work as a professional manga artist in 1955 with Shin Momotarō in Manga Shōnen. Shortly after, he became a frequent guest at the Tokiwa-sō apartment building, which brought together Osamu Tezuka with upcoming manga artists. There, he became close friends with Fujiko Fujio A.

He had a first hit in 1958 with the series Rumi-chan Kyōshitsu in Ribon and for another shōjo manga series, Bara-iro no Umi, he won the Kodansha Children's Manga Award in 1961. After that, he focused on shōnen manga magazines and published gag manga like Black-dan and Ninja Awate-maru. The latter was adapted into an anime TV series called Pyunpyun Maru in 1967. From 1971 on, he illustrated the series Karate Master based on a script by Ikki Kajiwara and it became a big hit. In 1973, Tsunoda was replaced as an illustrator for the series by Jōya Kagemaru.

Tsunoda became interested in occultism and created manga based on paranormal ideas from the 1970s on. Kyōfu Shinbun and Ushiro no Hyakutarō are his most famous occult manga.

== Works ==
- Shin Momotarō (新桃太郎, 1955, published in Manga Shōnen)
- Rumi-chan Kyōshitsu (ルミちゃん教室, 1958, serialized in Ribon)
- Super Manbee (スーパー万兵衛, 1959)
- Boku wa Jonbee (ぼくはジョンべえ, 1960, serialized in Shōnen Sunday)
- Bara-iro no Umi (バラ色の海, 1961, serialized in Nakayoshi)
- Black-dan (ブラック団, 1964–1966, serialized in Shōnen Sunday)
- Ore no Taiyō (俺の太陽, 1965–1966, serialized in Shōnen Sunday)
- Ninja Awate-maru (忍者あわて丸, 1965–1968, serialized in Shōnen King)
- Kaimushi Kabuton (怪虫カブトン, 1966, serialized in Shōnen Sunday)
- Guri Guri (グリグリ, 1967, serialized in Shōnen Sunday)
- Rival no Hata (ライバルの旗, 1968, serialized in Bōken Ō)
- Tenamonya Ipponyari (てなもんや一本槍, 1968, serialized in Shōnen Sunday)
- Niji wo yobu Ken (虹をよぶ拳, 1969–1970, serialized in Bōken Ō, written by Ikki Kajiwara)
- Karate Master (空手バカ一代 Karate Baka Ichidai, 1971–1973, serialized in Shōnen Magazine, written by Ikki Kajiwara, taken over by Jōya Kagemaru)
- Bōrei Gakkyū (亡霊学級, 1974, serialized in Shōnen Champion)
- Nakuna! Jūen (泣くな！十円, 1971–1973, serialized in Shōnen Champion)
- Kyōfu Shinbun (恐怖新聞, 1973–1975, serialized in Shōnen Champion)
- Ushiro no Hyakutarō (うしろの百太郎, 1973–1976, serialized in Shōnen Magazine)
- Sonota-kun (その他くん, 1976, serialized in Shōnen Magazine)
- Megido no Hi (メギドの火, 1976, serialized in Shōnen Sunday)
- 5-go no Ryū (5五の龍, 1978–1980)
- Ginza Kazoku (銀座花族, 1980–1981, serialized in Shūkan Josei)
- Renge Densetsu (蓮華伝説, 1981, serialized in Weekly Manga Goraku)
- Tokimeki no Haka (ときめきの墓, 1982–1983)
- Mayonaka no Loveletter (真夜中のラブレター, 1982–1984, serialized in Shūkan Josei)
- Shin Ushiro no Hyakutarō (新うしろの百太郎, 1985–1990)
- Shinsetsu Hyaku Monogatari (新説百物語, 1988)
- Gakuen Shichi Fushigi (学園七不思議, 1988–1989)
- Onna-tachi no Toki (女たちの詩, 1988–1989)
- Kyōfu Shinbun II (恐怖新聞II, 1991–1993, serialized in Suspiria)
