= Manga Shōnen =

Japanese manga magazine by Shueisha

- Cover of the inaugural 1947 issue of Manga Shōnen with art by Ichisaburo Sawai
- Categories: Shōnen manga
- Frequency: Monthly
- First issue: 20 December 1947
- Final issue: 1955
- Company: Gakudōsha
- Country: Japan
- Based in: Tokyo
- Language: Japanese

Manga Shōnen (漫画少年) was a monthly manga magazine published by Gakudōsha(学童社) between December 1947 and October 1955. The magazine was important in forming and promoting shōnen manga in post-war Japan.

== Legacy ==
The magazine was first published on 20 December 1947.

The magazine under the editorship of Kenichi Katō motivated its readers in its unique "readers section" to send in their own comics to the magazine for competitions. Many new artists emerged due to this; for example Yoshihiro Tatsumi and Hideko Mizuno at a young age sent in manga to competitions of the magazine. Young artists published in the magazine were often contacted by other publishers for commissions. Shotaro Ishinomori, Fujiko Fujio, Jirō Tsunoda and Leiji Matsumoto started their professional careers in the magazine. Tezuka founded his magazine COM in 1967 with the intention to give space for new manga artists to experiment, like Manga Shōnen had been during its existence.

The magazine managed to capture the new graphic developments of story manga, as it was popular in the Osaka-based akahon market and gained a big readership. Kenichi Katō had previously been the editor of the popular boys magazine Shōnen Club at Kodansha and had good connections to some of the most popular artists at the time. Kimba the White Lion by Osamu Tezuka was the most popular series from the magazine.

== Features ==
Among the series featured in the magazine were:

- Bat Kid by Kazuo Inoue and Eiichi Fukui (1947-1949)
- Kimba the White Lion by Osamu Tezuka (1950-1954)
- Manga Classroom by Osamu Tezuka (1952-1954)
- Donmai-kun (ドンマイ君) by Eiichi Fukui
- Phoenix by Osamu Tezuka (1954-1955)
- Nikyū Tenshi (二級天使) by Shotaro Ishinomori (1955)
