= Yoshihiro Yonezawa =

Japanese manga critic

- A photograph of Comiket's co-founder and president, Yoshihiro Yonezawa.
- Born: March 21, 1953; Kumamoto, Kumamoto, Japan
- Died: October 1, 2006 (aged 53); Shibuya, Tokyo, Japan
- Occupations: manga critic & Comiket co-founder and president
- Spouse: Eiko Yonezawa
- Writing career
- Subject: Manga

Yoshihiro Yonezawa (米澤 嘉博, Yonezawa Yoshihiro; March 21, 1953 – October 1, 2006) was a Japanese manga critic and author. He is also known for being Comiket's co-founder and president. He died of lung cancer at 53. He won the 2007 Seiun Award in the special category and 2010 Tezuka Osamu Cultural Prize Special Award.

== Biography ==
=== Early Life ===
Born in Kumamoto, Japan, on March 21, 1953, Yoshihiro Yonezawa began drawing parodies of his favourite manga characters with the encouragement of his father when he was a child. As a fan of Osamu Tezuka and Shigeru Mizuki he would start dōjin activities in middle school, releasing several works under the circle "Azu Manga Research Club." In 1969, Yonezawa joined the staff of Kyukon and met SF writer Shinji Kajio at age 16. Yonezawa would go on to attend Kumamoto Prefectural Kumamoto High School where he participated in anti-war student activism, throwing molotov cocktails while protesting the stationing of American nuclear aircraft carriers at USFA Sasebo and getting detained by the police.

=== Career ===
He began criticizing manga while he was studying engineering at Meiji University, as part of the group Meikyu. Yonezawa has said that in the early 1970s, mostly mainstream manga were published, as there were few manga magazines at that time. COM, a manga magazine with a reputation for publishing experimental manga had closed in 1972, and Yonezawa believed that by 1973 and 1974, it was very difficult to publish "unusual" works in anything other than "underground" zines devoted to dōjinshi.

=== Comiket ===
To explore the potential of the medium, he co-founded Comiket (The Comic Market) in 1975 with Harada Teruo (chairman) and Aniwa Jun, who were university students. Comiket is a bi-annual, 3-day event where dōjinshi manga is brought and traded. Yonezawa's publication of The History of Post War Manga Trilogy in 1980 showed his devotion to reviewing and chronicling manga. He was a judge for the Tezuka Osamu Cultural Prize. In 1999, he received the 21st Japan Society of Publishing Studies Award for Bessatsu Taiyo: Hakkinbon. Since 1999, he regularly reviewed manga on his column, "Yoshihiro Yonezawa's Commentary on Contemporary Mangas [sic]", in Media Factory's Monthly Comic Flapper until October 2006. He was posthumously awarded the 2007 Seiun Award in the special category, and the special Tezuka Osamu Cultural Prize in 2010.

=== Death ===
He was hospitalised on September 30, 2006, and on October 1, 2006, Yonezawa died of lung cancer at age 53. On the last day of Comiket 71 which was held from December 29 to 31, 2006, as announced in the event's catalogue, a thirty seconds of silence was held on 15:59 just before the announcement of closing.

== Yoshihiro Yonezawa Memorial Library ==
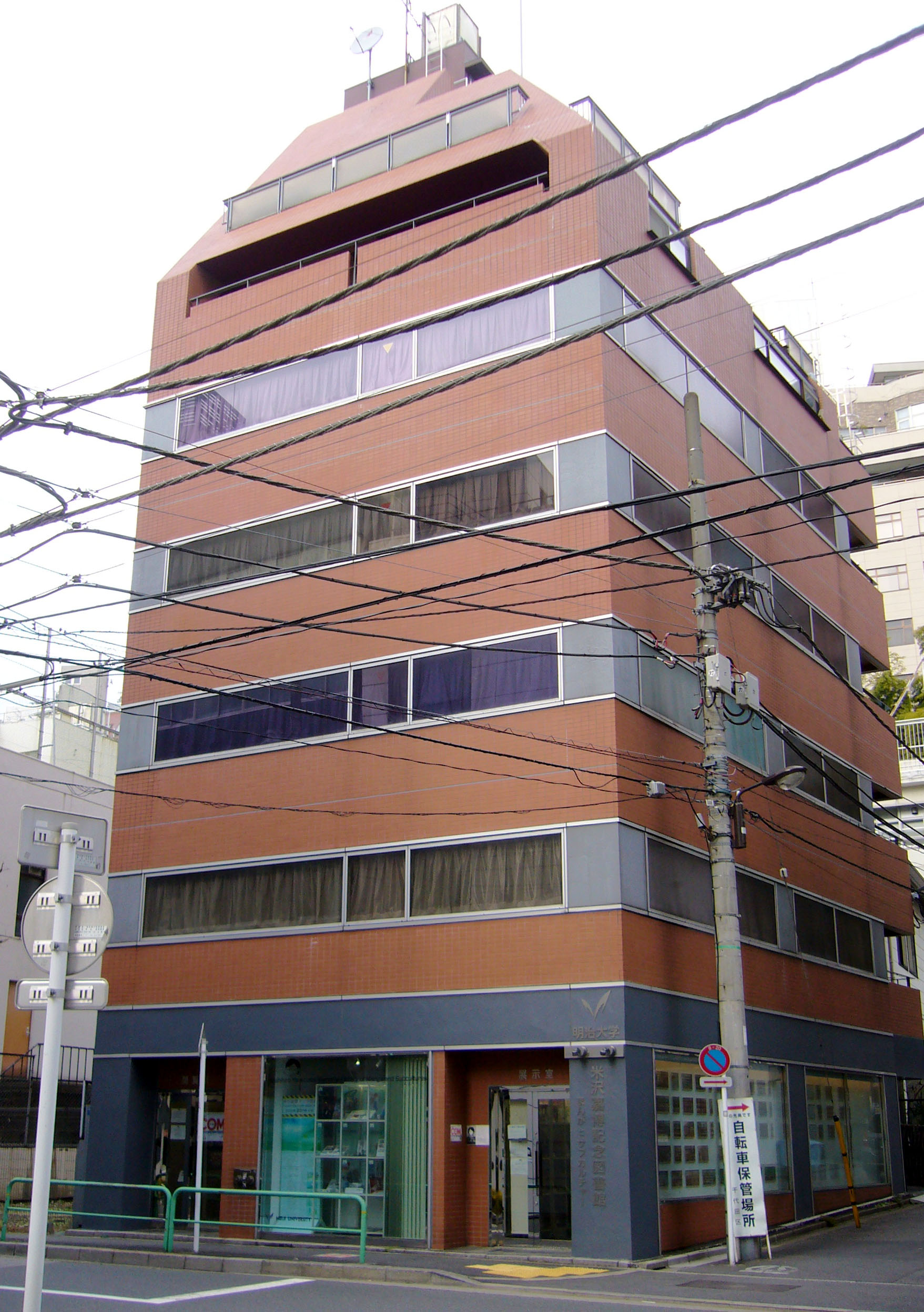
Yoshihiro Yonezawa Memorial Library of Manga and Subcultures 2012-02-26

In 2009, Meiji University opened a library housing dōjinshi, manga- and anime-related circle newsletters, as well as commercially published manga and manga magazines. The collection, which at present largely consists of Yonezawa's personal collection, donated by his widow, has been named "Yoshihiro Yonezawa Memorial Library of Manga and Subcultures." The library is located at the university's Surugadai campus. The core collection comprises Yonezawa's dōjinshi collection, consisting of 4,137 boxes, or over 140,000 items. The library will also incorporate the collection of Tsuguo Iwata. The construction of the new library complex is expected to be complete in 2015.

== Works ==
- Yonezawa, Yoshihiro (1980) Sengō SF Mangashi (戦後SFマンガ史; lit. "A History of Postwar SF Manga") Tokyo: Shinpyōsha
- Yonezawa, Yoshihiro (1980) Sengō Shōjo Mangashi (戦後少女マンガ史; lit. 'A History of Postwar Girls' Manga') Tokyo: Shinpyōsha
- Yonezawa, Yoshihiro (1981) Sengō Gyaggu Mangashi (戦後ギャグマンガ史; lit. 'A History of Postwar Gag Manga') Tokyo: Shinpyōsha
- Yonezawa, Yoshihiro, ed. (1991) Kodomo no Shōwa-shi: Shōjo manga no sekai I, Shōwa 20 nen – 37 nen (子供の昭和史──少女マンガの世界 I 昭和20年〜37年 "A Children's History of Showa-Era Japan: The World of Shōjo Manga I, 1945–1962") Bessatsu Taiyō series. Tokyo: Heibonsha
- Yonezawa, Yoshihiro, ed. (1991) Kodomo no Shōwa-shi: Shōjo manga no sekai II, Shōwa 38 nen – 64 nen (子供の昭和史──少女マンガの世界 II 昭和38年〜64年 "A Children's History of Showa-Era Japan: The World of Shōjo Manga II, 1963–1989") Bessatsu Taiyō series. Tokyo: Heibonsha
- Yonezawa, Yoshihiro (1997) Tezuka Osamu manga taizen: kodomo no shōwashi (手塚治虫マンガ大全： 子どもの昭和史) Tokyo: Heibonsha ISBN 4-582-94291-1
- Yonezawa, Yoshihiro (1999) アメリカB級グッズ道 "The World of Collection B-Class American Memorabilia"
- Yonezawa, Yoshihiro (2001) Sengō ero manga-shi (戦後エロマンガ史, lit. "A History of Postwar ero manga") Tokio: Seirinkogeisha ISBN 978-4-88379-258-0
- Yonezawa, Yoshihiro (2002) 戦後野球マンガ史 "The History of Post War Baseball Manga" Heibonsha
- Yonezawa, Yoshihiro (2002) 藤子不二雄論—Fと(A)の方程式 "On Fujiko Fujio ~ The Formula of F and (A)"
- Yonezawa, Yoshihiro (2003) The Worldwide Phenomenon of Anime: Past and Present Nipponia 27
- Yonezawa, Yoshihiro (2004) マンガで読む「涙」の構造 "The Formalism of "Tears" As Depicted In Manga" NHK
- Yonezawa, Yoshihiro (2007) Tezuka Osamu mangaron (手塚治虫マンガ論) Tokyo: Kawade Shobō Shinsha ISBN 978-4-309-26959-7
