= Miyamoto Musashi in fiction =

This is a list of fictional depictions of Miyamoto Musashi, a 17th-century Japanese swordsman.

== Film, television and theatre ==
=== Films ===
- Miyamoto Musashi (1929), directed by Kintaro Inoue.
- Miyamoto Musashi Chi no Maki (1937), directed by Takizawa Eisuke.
- Miyamoto Musashi (1938), directed by Kazuo Mori.
- Miyamoto Musashi Chi no Maki (1938), directed by Ishihashi Seiichi.
- Miyamoto Musashi Ketto Hannyazaka (1943), directed by Daisuke Ito.
- Miyamoto Musashi: Kongoin no Ketto (1943), directed by Daisuke Ito.
- Miyamoto Musashi: Nito-ryu Kaigen (1943), directed by Daisuke Ito.
- Miyamoto Musashi (1944), directed by Kenji Mizoguchi.
- Miyamoto Musashi (1954), directed by Yasuo Kohata.
- The Samurai Trilogy, directed by Hiroshi Inagaki and starring Toshiro Mifune:
  - Samurai I: Musashi Miyamoto (1954)
  - Samurai II: Duel at Ichijoji Temple (1955)
  - Samurai III: Duel at Ganryu Island (1956)
- Miyamoto Musashi shonen (1956), directed by Tatsuo Sakai.
- Zen and Sword: The Miyamoto Musashi Saga, directed by Tomu Uchida and starring Kinnosuke Nakamura:
  - Miyamoto Musashi (1961)
  - Miyamoto Musashi II: Showdown at Hannyazaka Heights (1962)
  - Miyamoto Musashi III: Birth of the Two Sword Style (1963)
  - Miyamoto Musashi IV: Duel at Ichijo-ji Temple (1964)
  - Miyamoto Musashi V: Duel at Ganryu Island (1965)
- Miyamoto Musashi: Sword of Fury (1973), directed by Tai Kato.
- Miyamoto appears along with Jubei Yagyu in Kinji Fukasaku's Samurai Reincarnation (1981).
- Ganryujima: Kojiro and Musashi (1992), directed by Yuji Murakami.
- Musashi appears in Ryuhei Kitamura's film Aragami (2003) as the titular character: a god of battle.
- Musashi is mentioned in the narration of the neo-noir film The Perfect Sleep (2009).
- Samurai (2010), a documentary featuring Mark Dacascos.
- Crazy Samurai Musashi (2020), directed by Yūji Shimomura and starring Tak Sakaguchi as Musashi.

=== Television ===
- Sorekara no Musashi (1964–65), starring Ryunosuke Tsukigata.
- Sorekara no Musashi (1981), starring Nakamura Kinnosuke. The series was distributed with English subtitles as Miyamoto Musashi.
- Miyamoto Musashi (1990), starring Kinya Kitaoji.
- Sorekara no Musashi (1996), starring Kinya Kitaoji.
- The 42nd NHK taiga drama 武蔵 MUSASHI (2003) is based largely on the Yoshikawa novel and stars kabuki actor Ichikawa Ebizō XI.
- Miyamoto Musashi appears in the 2009 Korean TV drama Return of Iljimae, where he is portrayed by Hwang Jang Lee.
- In the American series Heroes, Adam Monroe, an Englishman who came to Japan seeking a fortune, is portrayed in feudal Japan as Takezo Kensei (剣聖 武蔵, Kensei Takezō), a samurai and swordsman based on Miyamoto Musashi, evidenced by the fact that "Takezo" was his birth name, and "kensei" means "master swordsman."
- Musashi (2003), directed by Ozaki Mitsunobu and starring Kabuki actor Ichikawa Shinnosuke.
- Miyamoto Musashi (2014), directed by Sasaki Akimitsu and Fujio Takashi and starring Kamikawa Takaya.
- Miyamoto Musashi (2014), Two-Part TV Series stars Takuya Kimura, Ikki Sawamura and directed by Ryôsuke Kanesaki.
- In the Japanese live action series Kamen Rider Ghost (2015–16), the protagonist is tasked with gathering the souls of notable historical figures including Musashi.
- A "host" of Musashi appears in two episodes of the second season of Westworld, where he resides in Shogun World.
- Miyamoto Musashi appears in Baki-Dou: The Invincible Samurai, as the main antagonist.

=== Theatre ===
- "Musashi" (2010), written by Hisashi Inoue and directed by Yukio Ninagawa.

== Print ==
- Eiji Yoshikawa's novel Musashi is based on historical events, but features some fictitious characters. It was called the "Gone with the Wind of Japan" by Edwin O. Reischauer in its foreword.
- The manga series Vagabond is loosely based on Musashi, with protagonist Takezō later renamed Miyamoto Musashi and seeking to become the greatest swordsman in the land.
- The Necromancer, the fourth installment in Michael Scott's The Secrets of the Immortal Nicholas Flamel series, refers to Niten. Perenelle Flamel states that "he is undoubtedly the greatest swordsman in the world—the only human ever to defeat Scathach in single combat. But if you ask him what he is, he will tell you that he is an artist. And that is true: his skill with the brush is legendary. [...] Niten has traveled this world and the nearby Shadowrealms in search of opponents to fight simply to hone his skills. He was supposed to have been made immortal sometime in the seventeenth century by Benzaiten, who many—including the Witch—believe may even be one of the ancient Great Elders. Niten was also known as Miyamoto Musashi."
- Sorekara no Musashi (Further Tales of Musashi), a novel by Katsukiro Kouyama which has been adapted into several television specials.
- In Robert Jordan's book The Dragon Reborn, a man named Jearom is stated to have been a great swordsman whose only loss was to a farmer wielding a quarterstaff, likely a reference to Musashi's fight with Gonnosuke in Yoshikawa's novel.
- In Getter Robo, Musashi is a pilot who carries a sword.
- The comic book Usagi Yojimbo stars a rabbit samurai inspired by Musashi.
- In Steve Perry's Matador book series and novel The Musashi Flex, the "Musashi Flex" is an illegal underground martial arts competition named after Musashi.
- Musashi was the subject of Sword of the Samurai, a book in the Time Machine series by Michael Reaves and Steve Perry.
- In the book The Ninja by Eric van Lustbader there are several references to Musashi and The Book of Five Rings.
- In Chris Bradford's Young Samurai series, Miyamoto Musashi was the basis for Masamoto Takeshi.
- In the novel The Blade of the Courtesans by Keiichiro Ryu, Musashi saves a baby named Matsunaga Seiichiro, the imperial prince of Japan, and mentors him and teaches him in the art of Niten Ichi-ryu in the mountains of Higo. When Seiichiro turns 26 years old, he is sent to Edo to find Shoji Jin'emon in Yoshiwara.
- Musashi appears in the Image comics series Five Ghosts, written by Frank J. Barbiere with art by Chris Mooneyham. Musashi appears as a spirit who gives his skills to treasure hunter Fabian Gray along with four other spirits: Merlin, Robin Hood, Sherlock Holmes and Count Dracula.
- David Kirk's novels Child of Vengeance (2013) and Sword of Honor (2015) are based on mostly historical events as well as legends about Musashi. The novels follow Musashi, a sickly and weak boy whose father, Munisai, considers him to be unworthy. As he grows up, his uncle Dorinbo trains him in Buddhism and reading and writing, and later his father Munisai trains him in the sword. Musashi is described as a tall man with an advantage in reach and strength who uses his environment and tactics to defeat others. After fighting in the Battle of Sekigahara, Musashi abandons the ways of the samurai and becomes a ronin after developing a hatred for samurai. He is pursued by an adept swordsman, Akiyama, from the Yoshioka school, and later by Denshichiro, the head of the school.
- Hideki Mori's manga Shishi, which is based on the life of Miyamoto Musashi.
- In Marvel Comics, Miyamoto Musashi was a previous Ghost Rider known as the Ghost Ronin.

== Manga and anime ==
- Karakuri Kengō Den Musashi Lord stars the robot Musashi, whose rival is named Kojiro.
- Musashi is named by Hydra in the ninth episode of UFO Princess Valkyrie's second season.
- Musashi (Jessie in English) and Kojiro (James in English) of the Team Rocket trio in Pokémon are named after Miyamoto and Kojiro, respectively. As well, Jessie's mother, who appears in an audio drama, is named Miyamoto.
- Musashi appears in the first seven episodes of Shura no Toki – Age of Chaos, where he duels against a martial artist.
- The two male protagonists in the Japanese television drama Bus Stop are named Miyamae Musashi and Sasajima Kojiro. In one episode, the main female character remarks that she is like the island where Musashi and Kojiro dueled.
- In the anime Yaiba, Musashi appears as an old man living as a hermit. Onimaru later resurrects Kojiro to fight for him, and he confronts Musashi again when he comes to visit Kojiro's grave.
- In the episode "Generous Elegy (Part 2) – Elegy of Entrapment (Verse 2)" of Samurai Champloo, an old man saves Jin from drowning after an assassin's ambush and claims to be Musashi before dismissing the claim.
- In Ninja Resurrection, Miyamoto Musashi appears and fights Jubei, and it is stated that he retired to the life of a hermit around the year 1640.
- At the end of the Cowboy Bebop episode "Cowboy Funk", Andy rides off into the sunset while claiming to have changed his name to Musashi.
- The protagonist of Musashi Gundoh, Miyamoto Musashi, is loosely based on Musashi.
- In one episode of Ranma ½, Tatewaki Kuno is possessed by a bokuto that Musashi wielded in his duel with Kojiro, causing him to believe that he is Musashi and wander the halls of Furinkan High School at night in search of a powerful opponent.
- In episode 55 of Rumiko Takahashi's Urusei Yatsura, Ataru's teacher is portrayed as Musashi, while Ataru's rival Mendou is portrayed as Kojiro.
- Kurz Weber briefly refers to Musashi Miyamoto in Full Metal Panic! in the episode "A Cat and a Kitten's Rock and Roll". When Teletha Testarossa is late for an Arm Slave battle with Melissa Mao, Kurz asks her if she has heard of Musashi.
- In Dr. Slump, Arale, Gatchan, and Taro use the time slipper to travel back in time to the day of his duel with Kojiro, and he and Arale spend two days playing Rochambeau to see who is stronger. He later goes with her to the present and attends her school, while Kojiro spends the rest of his days waiting for him.
- In Shugo Chara!, Kairi Sanjou idolizes Musashi, a trait which his Guardian Character Musashi was born from.
- Production I.G announced it was making an anime based on the life of Musashi, scheduled for release in 2009.
- In Eyeshield 21, Gen Takekura is nicknamed "Musashi", and his rival's name is Sasaki.
- In Yu Yu Hakusho, Kuwabara fights against a swordsman named Musashi during the Genki tournament arc.
- In Mutsu Enmei Ryuu Gaiden: Shura No Tok, Musashi makes several appearances in the chronicle of Mutsu Yakumo, culminating in a duel between him and Yakumo. Although he is defeated, Yakumo declares it a draw because he used his sword to block an attack.
- Murashi appears in Flint the Time Detective, where he befriends the Time Shifter Shadow.
- In Amakusa 1637, Masaki Miyamoto of modern-day Japan is transported back in time to the Shimabara Rebellion and loses his memories. After Otsu saves him and names him Miyamoto Musashi, he befriends her while gradually remembering his past and joining the heroes, time travelers who were his friends before being transported to the past.
- Miyamoto Musashi is the main character in the fourth main series of Baki Dou, where he is revived in the modern day through science and occultism and the main cast tries to challenge his swordsmanship.
- In One Piece, Roronoa Zoro is loosely based on Miyamoto Musashi, being a skilled all-around swordsman. Kozuki Oden, who is hailed as the strongest samurai of his lifetime, is also based on Musashi, as he dual wields two swords.
- In Shinobu Ohtaka's manga, Orient, the main protagonist, also named Musashi, is inspired by Miyamoto Musashi.
- In Kenichi: The Mightiest Disciple, Ōganosuke Yogi fights in a similar manner to Musashi.
- In Record of Ragnarok, Musashi appears in the backstory of Sasaki Kojiro as his greatest opponent that eventually killed him. He appears as an ally and spectator during Kojiro’s match and comments on round 10 with Kojiro.
- The Book of Five Rings: A Graphic Novel by Sean Michael Wilson and Chie Kutsuwada (2012) is a manga attempting a historically accurate portrayal of Musashi's life, based on research and translations by William Scott Wilson.
- Musashi is the main protagonist of the Netflix series Onimusha, loosely on the video game franchise of the same name.
- The Netflix anime Sound & Fury, providing a visual narrative for Sturgill Simpson's 2019 album of the same name, includes a quote from Musashi following the end credits, which reads "Get beyond love and grief and exist for the good of man", followed by a dedication to the lost souls and victims of senseless violence.

== Games ==
=== Video games ===
- Musashi no Bōken, a Family Computer game released in 1990, is based on Musashi.
- Haohmaru in SNK's Samurai Shodown series is loosely based on Musashi, while Tachibana Ukyo is based on Kojiro.
- The Neo Geo game Musashi Ganryuki, known outside Japan as Ganryu, is based on Musashi's fight with Kojiro.
- The character Yasuo from League of Legends is based on Musashi.
- The PlayStation game Brave Fencer Musashi and its PlayStation 2 sequel Musashi: Samurai Legend are based on Musashi. In the first game, Musashi must obtain the Five Scrolls of Fire, Earth, Water, Wind, and Sky and obtain the sword Lumina to seal away the evil Wizard of Darkness and later duels his rival Kojiro at the Dragon Island. In the second game, Musashi must obtain the five legendary swords of Earth, Water, Fire, Wind, and Void. The concept of collecting five elemental objects is similar to the Five Rings. His main secondary weapon, the "Great Oar", is based on how Muashi used a sword created from an oar.
- In Nioh, a young Miyamoto Musashi fights against demons alongside the protagonist in the mission "Master of the Twin Blades". He gives his name as Takezo and rewards the player with his headband, which grants a bonus to damage when using dual katanas. Musashi's rival, Sasaki Kojiro, can also be fought in the mission "Ganryu".
- In Live A Live (1994 with 2022 remake), Ode Iou resurrects Musashi and uses him to distract Oboromaru.
- Onimusha Blade Warriors features Sasaki Kojiro and Miyamoto Musashi as bonus characters.
- Onimusha: Way of the Sword, released in 2026, has Musashi take the role of the main playable character, with his likeness modelled after actor Toshiro Mifune.
- Miyamoto Musashi is a playable character in Koei's Samurai Warriors 2 and Warriors Orochi. The player can fight alongside, and later on, against, Musashi at the "Swordsman" story of Samurai Warriors: Katana. As well, the title chapters are based on The Book of Five Rings. Kojiro was added as a playable character in Samurai Warriors: Xtreme Legends, the expansion to Samurai Warriors.
- Heishiro Mitsurugi from Namco's Soul series is based on Musashi.
- Frandar Hunding of The Elder Scrolls universe is based on Musashi. He wrote a book called the Book of Circles, which is similar to The Book of Five Rings.
- In Sengoku Basara 2, Musashi is a playable character and wields a wooden sword and a boat oar as weapons.
- Musashi from SNK's The Last Blade is based on Musashi.
- Miyamoto Musashi is a playable character in the Warcraft III map Tides of Blood.
- Miyamoto Musashi appears as a main character in Ryu ga Gotoku Kenzan!.
- Musashi is a playable character of the samurai class in the original Shining Force.
- In Time Killers, the character Musashi is based on Musashi.
- In Teenage Mutant Ninja Turtles, when the player loses in the second Dojo stage with Donatello, Splinter quotes Miyamoto Musashi.
- Musashi appears as a bonus boss character in Soul of the Samurai when playing as Kotaro Hiba. Beating him allows him to dual wield two katanas like he did.
- A female version of Musashi appears as a Saber-class servant in Fate/Grand Order's and stars in the second part of its main storyline with the headline "Epic of Remnant". A male version of Musashi also appears as the narrator of the story. Musashi also appears as a Berserker-class Servant in Fate/Samurai Remnant, with the male version also appearing in flashbacks.
- Jetstream Sam from Metal Gear Rising: Revengeance is based on Musashi.
- In For Honor, the "Aramusha" hero is inspired by Musashi.
- In The Battle Cats, Special Cat Miyamoku Musashi is based on Musashi. The Japanese description of his enemy counterpart, Inumusha, references Musashi and Kojiro's duel at Ganryū Island.
- He appears as an optional boss in 2025 video game Ghost of Yōtei named "Takezo the Unrivaled" after beating other duelists at duelist trees around Ezo.
- He is a hero in the game 'Age of Empires: Mobile, a powerful, premium hero which requires real world cash to obtain.

=== Card and board games ===
- The collectible card game Magic: The Gathering has a card based on him, "Isshin, Two Heavens as One", named for his two swords as one technique.
- The board game Senjutsu: Battle for Japan features Musashi Miyamoto and Kojiro Sasaki as playable characters in the "Legends of Japan" character pack.

== Music ==
- In the 1983 album Piece of Mind by British heavy metal band Iron Maiden, Musashi appears in "Sun and Steel".
- In 2025 Swedish heavy metal band Sabaton (band) released The Duelist, a song about Miyamoto Musashi on their album Legends (Sabaton album)
- John Zorn's Ganryu Island (1984 Tzadik release tz7319) depicts the duel between Musashi and Kojiro.
- The video for drum and bass producer Photek's song "Ni Ten Ichi Ryu" features a samurai who fights similarly to Musashi.
