= Ninjas in popular culture =

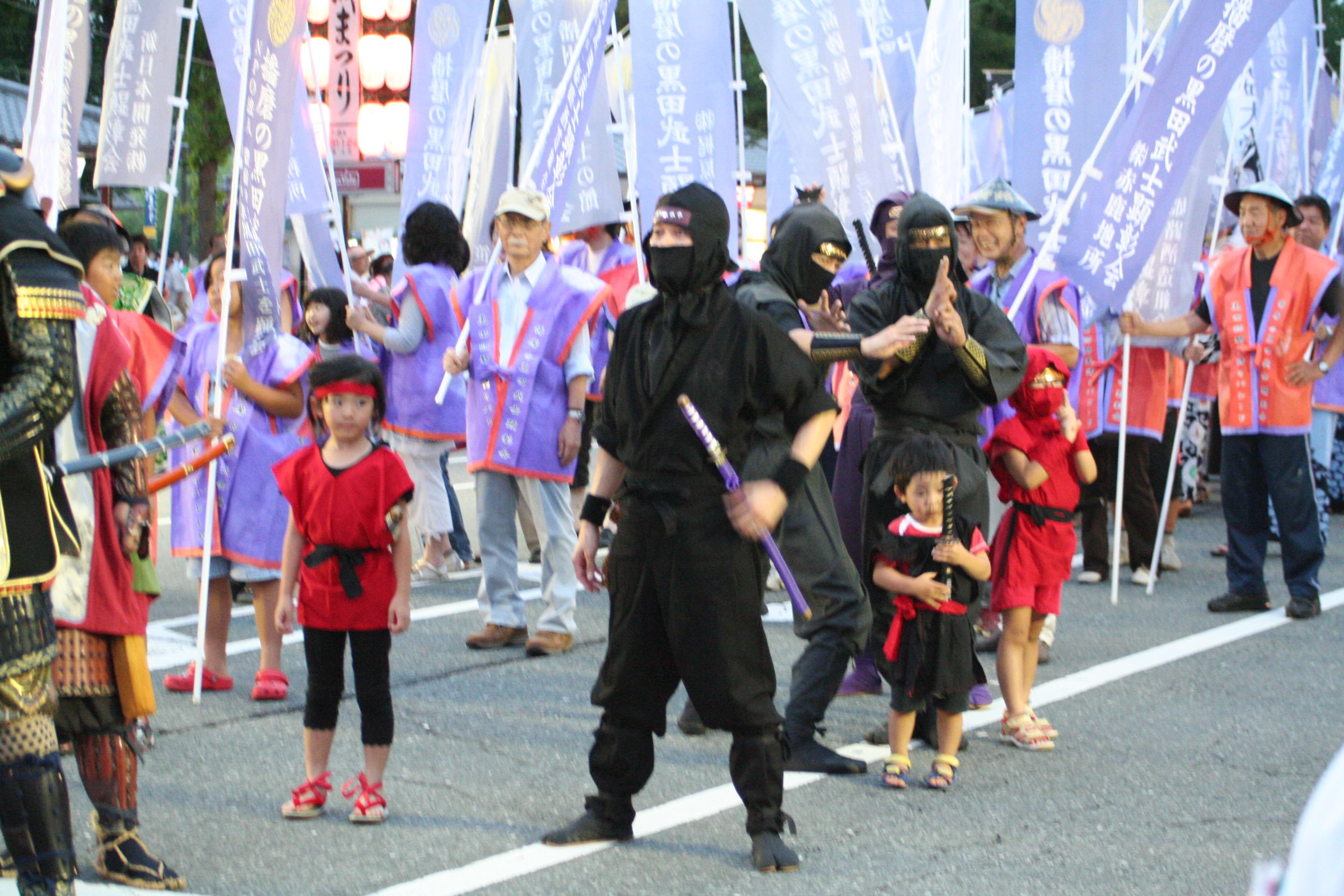
People dressed as ninjas during the 2009 Himeji Castle Festival in Himeji, Hyōgo, Japan

In the history of Japan, ninjas (also known as shinobi) operated as spies, assassins, or thieves; they formed their own caste outside the usual feudal social categories such as lords, samurai, and serfs. Ninja often appear as stock characters in Japanese and global popular culture.

== History ==
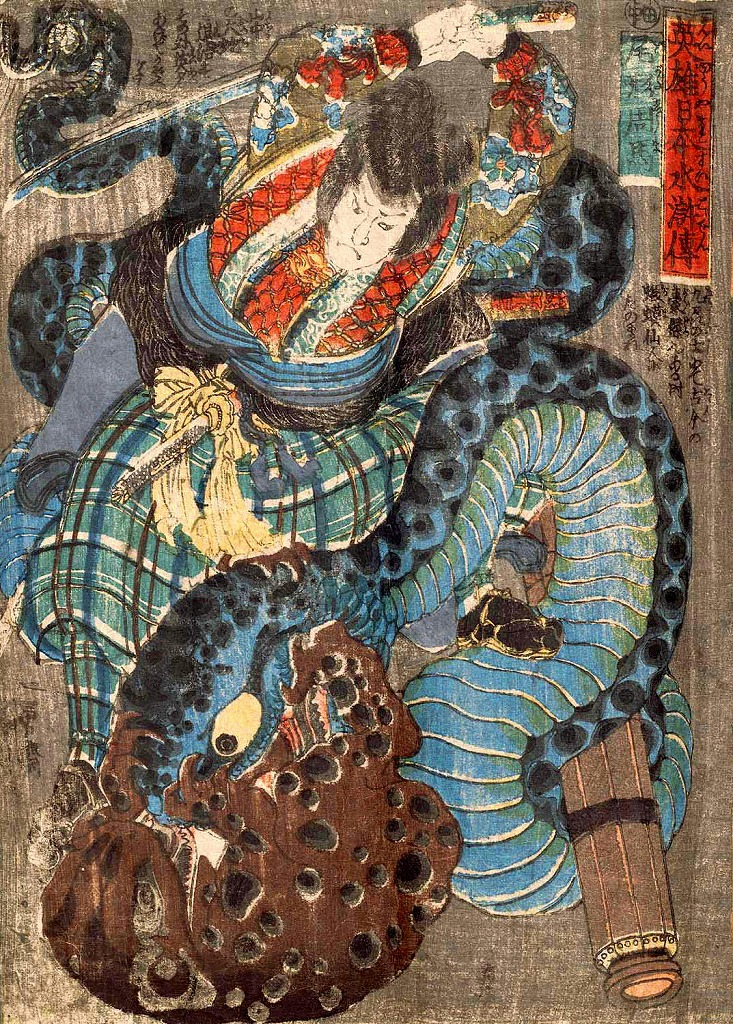
Jiraiya battles a snake with the help of a toad; woodblock print on paper by Utagawa Kuniyoshi, circa 1843

Ninjas first entered popular culture in the Edo period. In modern Japan, ninjas are a national myth that stems from folk tales and continues through modern day popular culture. Though many Japanese warriors performed amazing feats, there is no evidence that any of them were supernatural. Some of the folk tales are based on historical figures, such as a daimyō (lord) challenging a ninja to prove his worth by stealing his pillow or weapon while he slept.

=== Legendary abilities ===
Superhuman or supernatural powers were sometimes associated with the ninja. Such powers include flight, invisibility, shapeshifting, the ability to "split" into multiple bodies, the summoning of animals, and control over the five classical elements. These notions stemmed from popular imagination regarding the ninja's mysterious status, as well as romantic ideas found in later Japanese art during the Edo period. Magical powers were sometimes rooted in the ninja's own efforts to disseminate fanciful information. For example, Nakagawa Shoshujin, the 17th-century founder of Nakagawa-ryū, or martial art style, claimed in his own writings (Okufuji Monogatari) that he had the ability to transform into birds and animals.

Perceived control over the elements may be grounded in real tactics, which were categorized by association with forces of nature. For example, the practice of starting fires in order to cover a ninja's trail falls under katon-no-jutsu ("fire techniques").

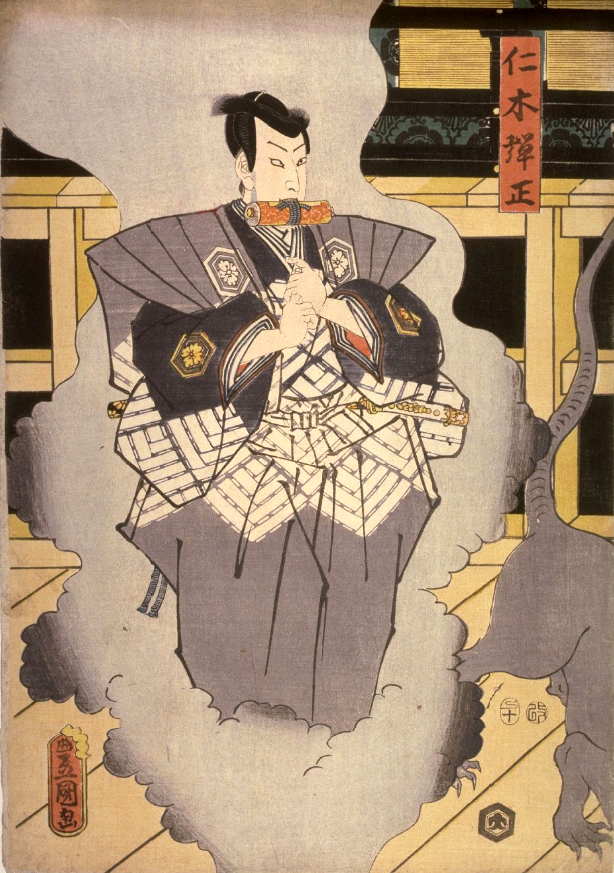
Actor portraying Nikki Danjō, a villain from the kabuki play Sendai Hagi. Shown with hands in a kuji-in seal, which allows him to transform into a giant rat. Woodblock print on paper. Kunisada, 1857.

The ninja's adaption of kites in espionage and warfare is another subject of legends. Accounts exist of ninja being lifted into the air by kites, where they flew over hostile terrain and descended into or dropped bombs on enemy territory. Kites were indeed used in Japanese warfare, but mostly for the purpose of sending messages and relaying signals. Turnbull suggests that kites lifting a man into midair might have been technically feasible, but states that the use of kites to form a human "hang glider" falls squarely in the realm of fantasy.

==== Kuji-kiri ====
Kuji-kiri is an esoteric religious practice which, when performed with an array of specified hand "seals" (kuji-in), or gestures, was meant to allow the ninja to interact with the spirit world and allow them to perform superhuman feats.

The kuji ("nine characters") is a concept originating from Taoism, where it was a string of nine words used in charms and incantations. In China, this tradition mixed with Buddhist beliefs, assigning each of the nine words to a Buddhist deity. The kuji may have arrived in Japan via Buddhism, where it flourished within Shugendō. Here too, each word in the kuji was associated with Buddhist deities, animals from Taoist mythology, and later, Shinto kami. The mudrā, a series of hand symbols representing different Buddhas, was applied to the kuji by Buddhists, possibly through the esoteric Mikkyō teachings. The yamabushi ascetics of Shugendō adopted this practice, using the hand gestures in spiritual, healing, and exorcism rituals.

Later, the use of kuji passed onto certain bujutsu (martial arts) and ninjutsu schools, where it was said to have many purposes. The application of kuji to produce a desired effect was called "cutting" (kiri) the kuji. Intended effects range from physical and mental concentration, to more incredible claims about rendering an opponent immobile, or even the casting of magical spells. These legends were captured in popular culture, which interpreted the kuji-kiri as a precursor to magical acts.

=== Modern popular culture ===
In modern popular culture, there were three major "ninja booms" in the 20th century, the first two booms largely limited to Japanese popular culture before becoming a global phenomenon with the third boom. The first boom was during the 1910s to 1920s, when the Sarutobi Sasuke series of children's novels became popular in Japan; the series depicted its shinobi protagonist as essentially a prototypical superhero, capable of a number of superhuman feats. The second "ninja boom" was in the 1960s, with the rise of Japanese ninja films, manga and television shows that became popular in Japan. By the mid-1960s, there were numerous popular ninja-themed media produced in Japan and it became popular for Japanese children to wear ninja costumes. During this second boom, some of the Japanese ninja-themed media were exported to several international markets such as Australia and Italy, but did not reach North America. This was also when ninjas made their first appearance in a Hollywood production, the James Bond film You Only Live Twice (1967), though the film depicted them more as commandos rather than traditional ninjas. The third "ninja boom" was in the 1980s. It was during this period in the early-to-mid-1980s that ninjas became a global phenomenon.

In North America, the success of Hong Kong martial arts films such as Bruce Lee's Enter the Dragon (1973) led to mainstream interest in martial arts films from Asian cinema, with American entertainment companies looking for the next "chopsocky" craze from Asia to repeat the success of 1970s kung fu films. Ninjutsu drew some American interest in the late 1970s, but was not very popular at the time. In 1977, the Japanese arcade game company Kasco released a light gun shooter electro-mechanical game called Ninja Gun, which helped introduce a number of American children to ninjas by the early 1980s. Eric Van Lustbader's novel The Ninja was published in 1980 and went on to become a New York Times Best Seller. Chuck Norris' film The Octagon, also released in 1980, made 18 million at the box office.

Around 1980, several American companies took notice of the "ninja craze" in Japan and were planning to capitalize on it with their own ninja-themed productions targeting the North American market. In March 1981, Variety magazine announced that fourteen American entertainment companies were planning to produce ninja films, including Zanuck/Brown Company's The Ninja, Stirling Silliphant's The Masters, and The Equals starring Scott Glenn and Toshirō Mifune, among others. However, several of these ninja-themed productions either did not release or failed to gain much success upon release. The North American breakthrough for ninja films came with Enter the Ninja, directed by Menahem Golan and released by Cannon Films in 1981, the success of which sparked the "ninja craze" in American popular culture and led to a wave of American-produced ninja films and television shows in the 1980s. Enter the Ninja also launched the career of Japanese martial arts star Sho Kosugi, who starred in its successful sequel Revenge of the Ninja in 1983 and portrayed ninja characters in other successful 1980s American productions such as The Master television series in 1984. A wave of ninja-themed films and television shows during the early-to-mid-1980s, especially those starring Sho Kosugi, led to "ninjamania" becoming a pop culture phenomenon across North America.

Many forms of ninja-themed merchandise were sold across North America during the early-to-mid-1980s, with American children replacing cowboy costumes for ninja costumes. It became a trend for items to be branded with the word "ninja" to generate more sales. For example, Parfums de Coeur introduced a perfume called Ninja which generated US$20,000,000 (equivalent to $71,000,000 in 2025) in sales over several years up until 1985, and the Kawasaki Ninja series of motorbikes were introduced in 1984.

Ninja video games emerged and became popular during the 1980s. Early ninja-themed video games included SNK's arcade shooting game Sasuke vs. Commander (1980), Taito's arcade games Ninja Hayate (1984) and Legend of Kage (1985), Sega's Ninja Princess (1985) starring a female ninja, and Konami's Ganbare Goemon series (1986 debut) based on the folk hero Ishikawa Goemon. Early ninja-themed home computer games included Saboteur (1985) and Ninja (1986), the latter featuring artwork resembling Sho Kosugi. Perhaps the most influential ninja video game was Sega's arcade hit Shinobi (1987), which spawned the Shinobi series, the longest-running ninja video game franchise. Series protagonist Joe Musashi was one of Sega's flagship characters in the late 1980s, along with Alex Kidd (before Sonic the Hedgehog). Shinobi was followed by a wave of ninja video games in the late 1980s, with some of the most popular including Taito's The Ninja Warriors series, System 3 Software's Last Ninja series, Data East's arcade hit Bad Dudes Vs. DragonNinja (1988), Tecmo's Ninja Gaiden and Dead or Alive series starring Ryu Hayabusa, and Capcom's Strider series. Major ninja-themed media franchises include Teenage Mutant Ninja Turtles, which debuted in 1984, and Naruto, which debuted in. 1999.

=== 1998 East Java ninja scare ===
The 1998 East Java ninja scare was an outbreak of mass hysteria in East Java, Indonesia, in which the local population believed they were being targeted by sorcerers known as ninja, who were blamed for mysterious killings of religious leaders by assassins dressed in black. As many as 150-300 “sorcerers” were killed between February and October, with the most deaths occurring between August and September.

=== Armed groups ===
Several real life paramilitary, police and militia groups use the names "Ninja" or "Ninjas":

- The Santomean special-police force of the Democratic Republic of São Tomé and Príncipe, officially known as the Emergency Police, are popularly known as Ninja.
- Rebels in the Pool Region of the Republic of the Congo called themselves Ninja.
- The Red Berets, a Croatian Serb rebel paramilitary group of Dragan Vasiljković based in Knin, Croatia, called themselves "Kninjas". During the early 1990s, the Kninjas were the subject of a Serbian comic-book series.
- Although some death squads active during the Indonesian occupation of East Timor called themselves "Ninja", the name was apparently borrowed from film rather than the Japanese model. "Ninja" gangs were also active elsewhere in Indonesia.
- During the Algerian Civil War, the government's commando units were known as "Ninja" because of their black hoods.
- The FBI's Hostage Rescue Team have been nicknamed "Ninjas".

=== Other ===
According to Indeed.com, there was a 7,000-percent increase in the number of job listings with the word "ninja" from 2006 to 2012. A former Russian soldier who committed robberies in Italy in black attire and a bow was called a "Russian ninja" by the BBC. The video-game series Tenchu was adapted for the Japanese stage. In 2006, Miss Japan Kurara Chibana appeared in a ninja-samurai costume for the Miss Universe competition. Goth Ninja, a type of Japanese street fashion, became popular in 2009.

In information technology, "cyber ninja" are sophisticated counter-hackers.

==== Business ====
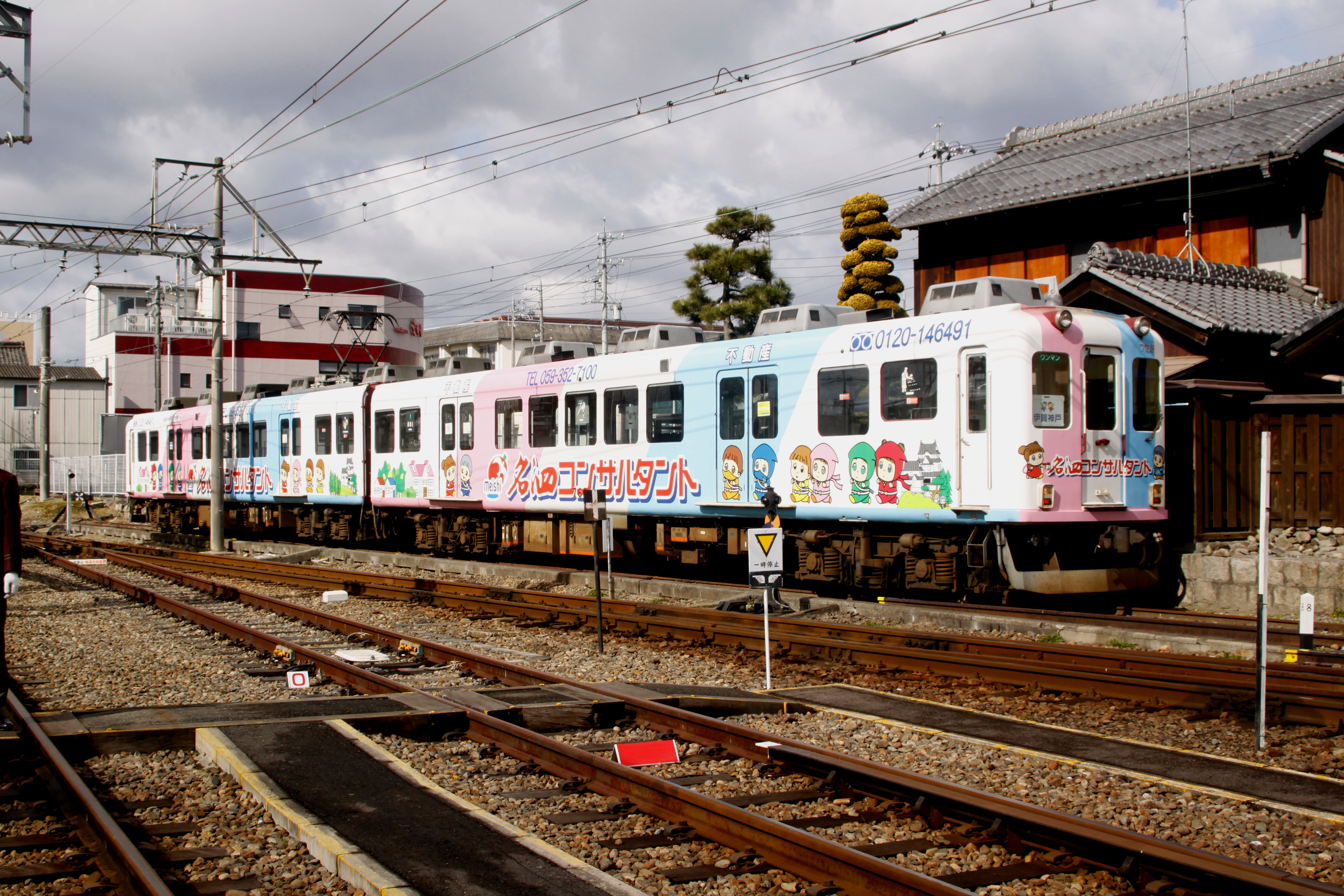
Iga Railway Line ninja-themed trains in Mie Prefecture, Japan in 2010

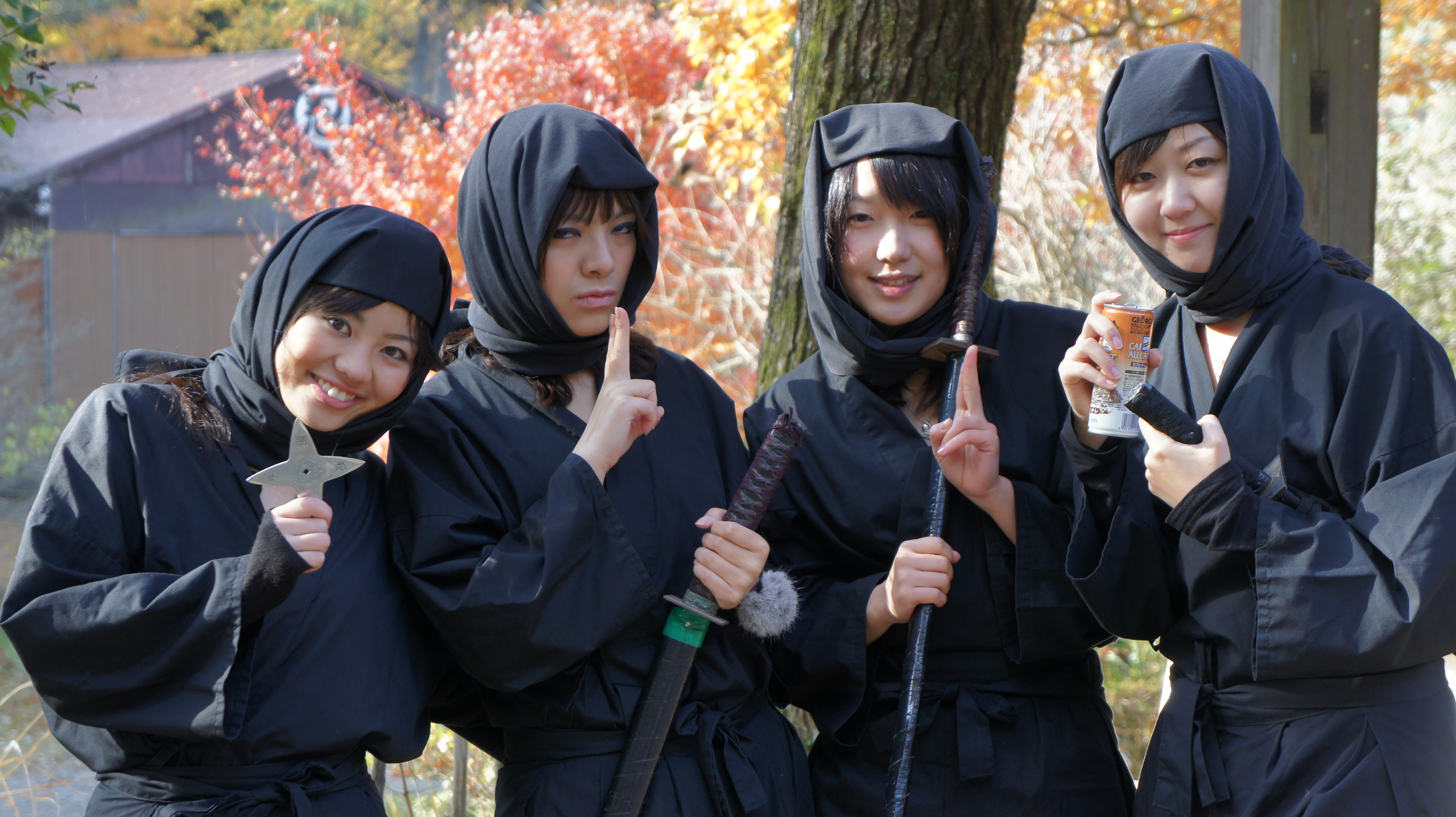
Attendees of a 2011 one-day ninja camp in Koga Ninja Village, Kōka, Shiga

Iga Ueno Ninja Festa, the annual ninja festival in Iga in the former province of Iga, has had ninja-inspired performances, competitions and opportunities to practice ninja skills since 1964.

==== Attractions ====
Other ninja attractions in Japan include the Koga Ninja Village and Kogaryu Ninjutsu Yashiki (Ninja Houses) in Koga-gun, Shiga Prefecture, the Togakushi Ninja Village for children, the Togakushi Ninpo Museum and Karakuri Yashiki (Ninja House) in Togakushi, Nagano, the Edo Wonderland theme park in Nikkō, Tochigi and the restaurants Men no Sato and Ninja Akasaka in Tokyo and Ninja Kyoto in Kyoto.

== Examples ==
=== Commercials ===
- Honda Hurricane ("Hiding Ninja") (1986).
- Miller Lite ("Bruce Piscopo") (1987).
- Diet Coke ("Ninja") (1987). and ("Train") (1988).
- Puma ("Holiday Heroes" spot 1) (2006). and ("Holiday Heroes" spot 2) (2006).
- GEICO ("Is the Pen Mightier Than the Sword?") (2011).
- Honda Civic ("Ninja") (2011).
- Nicorette (2011).
- HB-101 ("Flying Ninja") (2014). and ("It's a Miracle!") (2014).
- Alior Sync bank.
- Anime Network.
- Bombay Sapphire.
- Clamato
- FedEx.
- Free Realms.
- Mitsubishi UFJ Securities.
- MyHome.ie
- Nike.
- Nintendo Wi-Fi Connection.
- Oregon Lottery.
- Sure.

=== Documentaries ===
- Ancient Warriors - The Ninja: Warriors of the Night (1995).
- Unsolved History - Ninjas (2004).
- Shinobi - Winds of the 34 Generations (2006).
- MythBusters
  - Walking on Water (2007).
  - Myth Revolution (2007).
  - Ninjas 2 (2008).
- Cities of the Underworld - A-Bomb Underground (2008).
- Deadliest Warrior - Spartan vs Ninja (2009).
- The Search for Historical Ninjutsu (2011).
- Ninja Shadow Warriors (2012).
- Japanology Plus - Ninja (2014).
- Ninja Truth (2018- ).
- Bura Tamori 158「伊賀忍者～なぜ伊賀は“NINJA”の里になったのか？～」 (2019).
- Journeys in Japan「伊賀 忍者の里」 (2019).
- The Man Who Killed The Ninja (2020).

=== Literature ===
==== Novels ====
Ninja-themed novels include:

- Sarutobi Sasuke series (1911-1925)
- Yagyū Ichizoku no Inbō novels by Yoshihiro Matsunaga (松永義弘)
  - Yagyū Ichizoku no Inbō (柳生一族の陰謀) (1978). [novelization of the film of the same name]
  - Kiru: Zoku Yagyū Ichizoku no Inbō (斬る 続・柳生一族の陰謀) (1978).
- Nicholas Linnear novels by Eric Van Lustbader
  - The Ninja (1980)
  - The Miko (1984)
  - White Ninja (1990)
  - The Kaisho (1993)
  - Floating City (1994)
  - Second Skin (1995)
  - The Death and Life of Nicholas Linnear (2014) [e-book short story]
  - The Oligarch's Daughter (2016) [e-book short story]
- Brett Wallace: Ninja Master novels by Wade Barker
  - Ninja Master series
    - Vengeance is His (1981)
    - Mountain of Fear (1981)
    - Borderland of Hell (1982)
    - Million-Dollar Massacre (1982)
    - Black Magician (1982)
    - Death's Door (1982)
    - The Skin Swindle (1983)
    - Only the Good Die (1983)
  - Year of the Ninja Master series
    - Dragon Rising: Spring (1985)
    - Lion's Fire: Summer (1985)
    - Serpent's Eye: Autumn (1985)
    - Phoenix Sword: Winter (1986)
  - War of the Ninja Master series
    - War of the Ninja Master: The Kohga Ritual (1988)
    - War of the Ninja Master: The Shibo Discipline (1988)
    - War of the Ninja Master: The Himitsu Attack (1988)
    - War of the Ninja Master: The Zakka Slaughter (1988)
- Tulku, a Tale of Modern Ninja (1985) by American ninjutsu practitioner Stephen K. Hayes.
- Shimabara (1986) by Douglass Bailey
- Vineland (1990) by Thomas Pynchon.
- Batman: The Dragon and the Bat (1994) by Geary Gravel. [novelization of "Night of the Ninja" and "Day of the Samurai" from Batman: The Animated Series.]
- Zorro and the Dragon Riders by David Bergantino (1999).
- Blue Fingers: A Ninja's Tale (2004)
- Young Samurai novels by Chris Bradford.
  - Young Samurai: The Way of the Warrior (2008)
  - Young Samurai: The Way of the Sword (2009)
  - Young Samurai: The Way of Fire (2012) [e-book short story set between books 2 and 3]
  - Young Samurai: The Way of the Dragon (2010)
  - Young Samurai: The Ring of Earth (2010)
  - Young Samurai: The Ring of Water (2011)
  - Young Samurai: The Ring of Fire (2011)
  - Young Samurai: The Ring of Wind (2012)
  - Young Samurai: The Ring of Sky (2012)
  - Young Samurai: The Return of the Warrior (2019)
- Tsuma-wa, Kunoichi novels by Machio Kazeno (風野真知雄)
  - Tsuma-wa Kunoichi (妻は、くノ一) (2008-2011): 10 volumes
  - Tsuma-wa Kunoichi: Hebino Maki (妻は、くノ一 蛇之巻) (2013): 3 volumes
- Yin-Yang Code novels by Warren Chaney and Sho Kosugi.
  - Yin-Yang Code: The Drums of Tenkai-Bo (2017)
  - Yin-Yang Code: Shadow of Tenkai-Bo (2018)

==== Manga ====
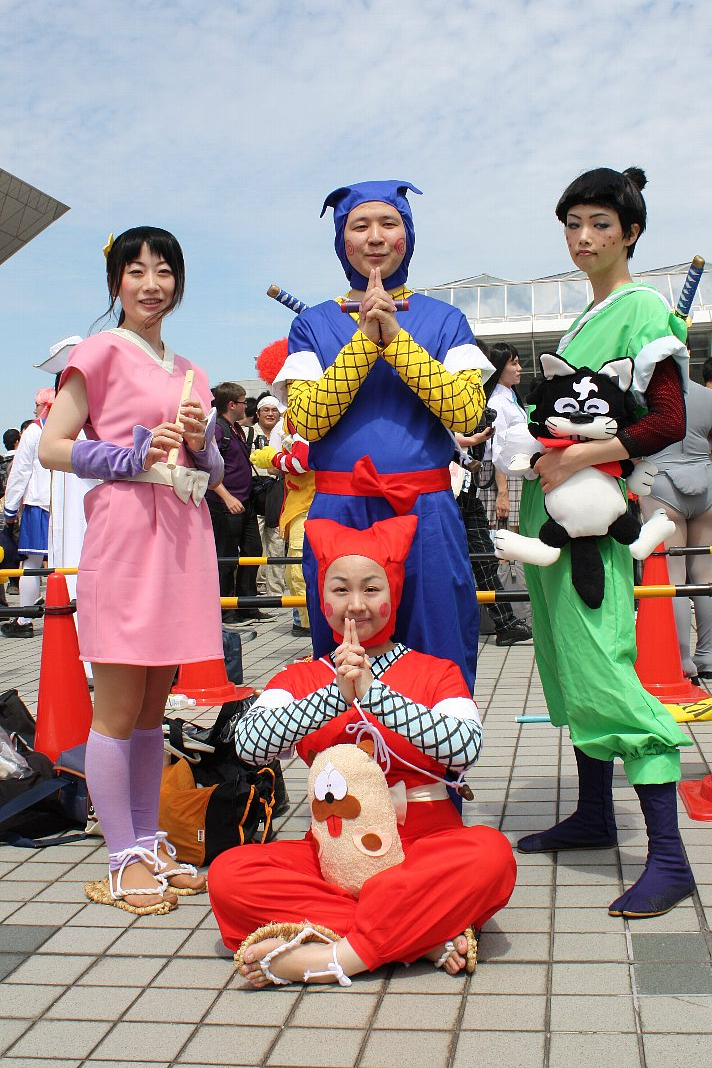
Ninja Hattori-kun cosplayers at Comiket 76

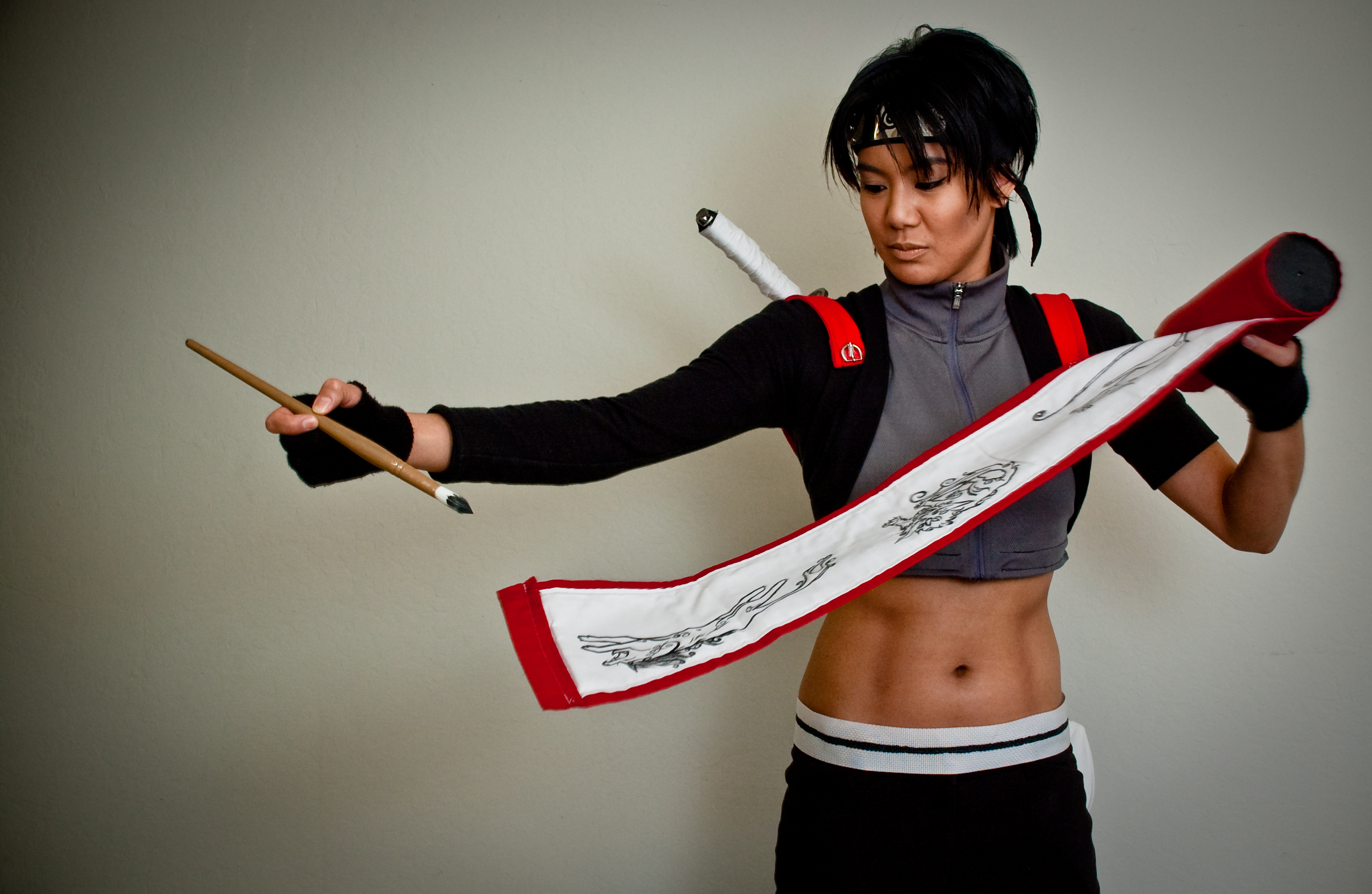
Cosplay of the Naruto character Sai

- Black Lion (Kuro no Shishi).
- Brave10: adaptation of Sanada Ten Braves.
- Kunoichi Hajimemashita!: gag series.
- Ninja Bugeichō: manga by Sanpei Shirato Kashi-hon book published from 1959 to 1962.
- Kamui Den: manga by Sanpei Shirato Serialized from 1964 to 1971.
- Naruto.
- Ninja Hattori-kun: manga by Fujiko Fujiko (later Fujiko A. Fujio) serialized from 1964 to 1988.
- Sarutobi Sasuke: manga by Shigeru Sugiura.
- Sasuga no Sarutobi: comedy manga by Fujihiko Hosono about a ninja high school.
- Shōnen Jiraiya: manga by Shigeru Sugiura.
- Tenshi wa Maiorita - Kunoichi Ibun: historical manga series by Ryoichi Ikegami.
- Zannen Kunoichi Den.

The following stories contain at least one ninja character, but are not ninja-themed:

- Planetes: Tanabe's neighbors are ninja.
- Sgt. Frog: One of the main characters, Lance Corporal Dororo/Zeroro is a cute blue male Keronian ninja.

==== Non-Japanese comics ====
- The Justice League: Shogun of Steel one-shot substitutes Batman with a Japanese female ninja named Komori (Bat).
- Half Past Danger.
- Zombee.
- G.I. Joe: A Real American Hero characters Storm Shadow and Snake-Eyes, and their family history, as well as Jinx and Cobra Night Creepers and Red Ninjas.
- Teenage Mutant Ninja Turtles: Many characters such as Turtles themselves, the Shredder and Karai are examples of this.

=== Music ===
- "Ninja", an American heavy metal band from Los Angeles formed before 1985.
- "Ninja", an American heavy metal band from New York formed before 1986.
- "Ninja", a German heavy metal band formed in 1986.
- "Ninja", a 1986 song by Europe (on "The Final Countdown").
- "The Ninja", a 1987 song by Cacophony (on "Speed Metal Symphony").
- "Ninja", a 1990 album and song by Christina Aguilar.
- "Inner Ninja", a 2012 song by Classified (on "Classified").
- "Ninjas", a 2017 song by Rey Pila.
- Ninja Crew.
- Built by Ninjas is a music video production group formed by Jaret Reddick and Heath Balderston.
- Fans of the rap group Insane Clown Posse, known as juggalos, sometimes refer to themselves as "ninja".
- Members of Momoiro Clover Z dressed as ninja for the music video for "D' no Junjō".
- Rika Adachi performed in a music video based on a song from Naruto.

=== Sports ===
- Iga FC Kunoichi is a Japanese Nadeshiko League women's association football team.
- Ninja Chops wrestles in the Naked Women's Wrestling League.

== See also ==
- List of ninja video games
