= Sarutobi Sasuke =

Legendary ninja

Sarutobi Sasuke (猿飛佐助, Sarutobi Sasuke) is a ninja who appears in kōdan narrative art and writings. The nickname is generally believed to have been concocted sometime between the Meiji to the Taishō periods. Some argue he is based on real live personages, such as Kōzuki Sasuke (上月佐助, Kōzuki Sasuke) and Sarutobi Nisuke (猿飛仁助, Sarutobi Nisuke). His family name, meaning "monkey jump", is written with two kanji; saru (猿) is the character for "monkey", and tobi (飛) is the character for "jump". He was known for his monkey-like agility and quickness, especially in trees. Many depictions portray him as having been orphaned and raised by a band of monkeys, therefore giving rise to the monkey-like abilities. He has been described as a superhero ninja, and caused a boom of ninjas in popular culture during the 1910s-1920s in Japan.

== In folklore ==
Sasuke is commonly listed as the leader of the Sanada Ten Braves, a fictional group of ten ninja that supposedly assisted the warlord Sanada Yukimura at the Siege of Osaka and he is by far the best known and most popular among them. When appearing with Kirigakure Saizō, one of his fellow Ten Braves, he is often thus contrasted with his best friend/arch-rival, who usually has an elegant, or at least clean-cut, appearance and magic-like ability. Sasuke is generally said to be a Kōga ninja, whereas Saizō is an Iga ninja. As such, when the two appear together, they are almost always depicted as arch-rivals and later, after being recruited to the Sanada cause, best friends. (This rivalry parallels the Iga-Kōga rivalry and the Hattori-Fūma rivalries in ninja fiction.) It is said he fell in battle against the forces of Tokugawa Ieyasu during the Siege of Osaka in the summer of 1615; but there is no historical record of this. In another version, Sasuke infiltrated Tokugawa Ieyasu's stronghold during 1615 and, having caught his foot in a bear trap while escaping the enemy, cut it off at the ankle to escape and then took his own life rather than be captured.

== In popular culture ==
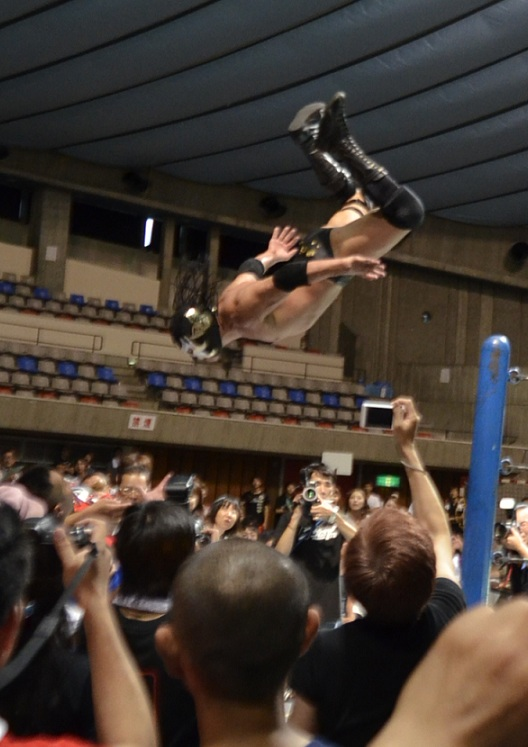
The wrestler The Great Sasuke is named after Sarutobi Sasuke.

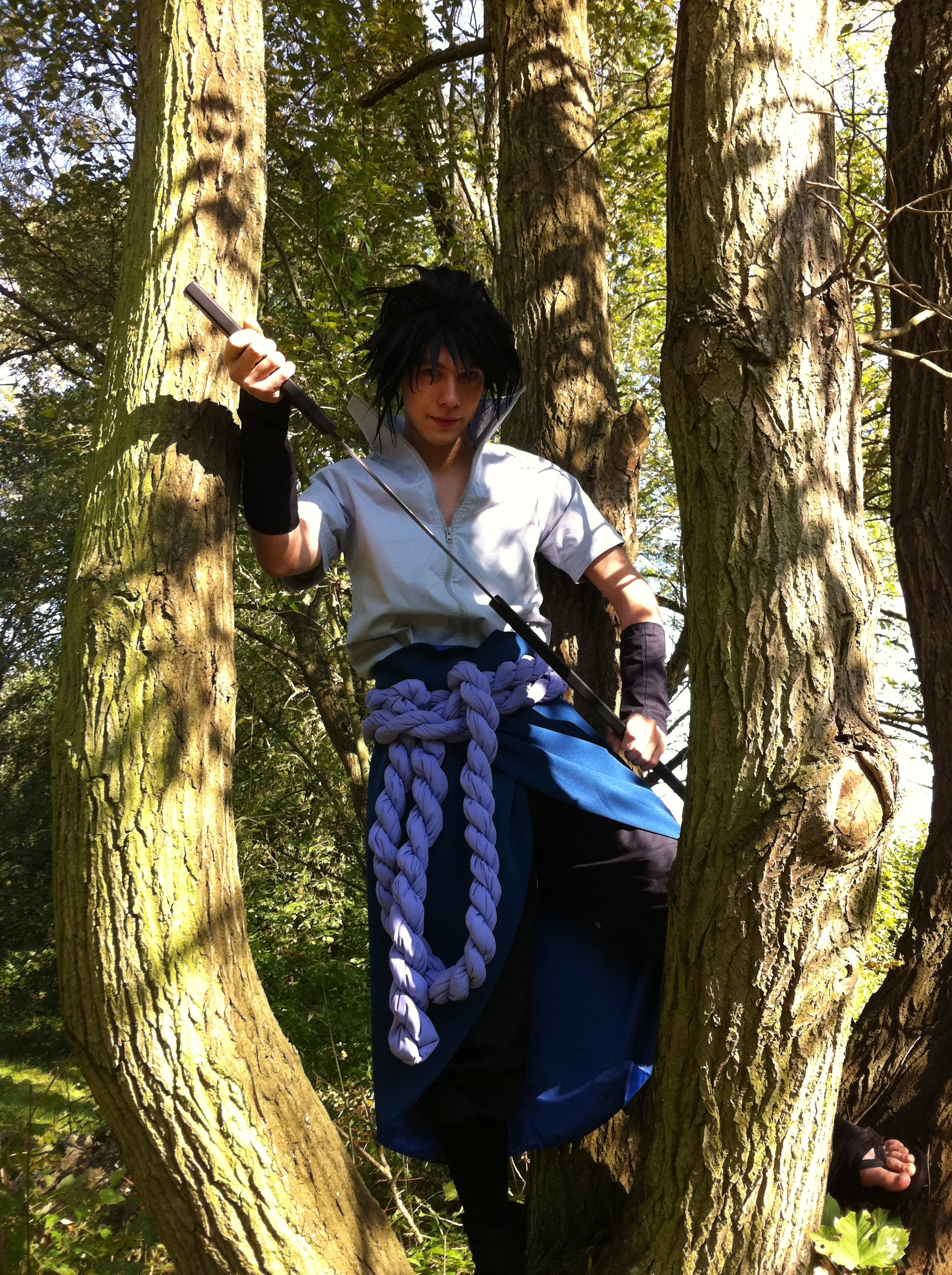
Cosplay of Sasuke Uchiha, also named after Sarutobi Sasuke.

Sarutobi Sasuke's image has been very influential in ninja fiction, in which he is usually portrayed as a young boy. The character was immortalized in contemporary Japanese culture by the popular Tachikawa Bunko (Pocket Books) children's literature between 1911 and 1925, as well as in Sarutobi Sasuke, one of the more famous gag manga by Shigeru Sugiura from the 1950s (followed by Shōnen Jiraiya).

He has been described as a superhero ninja. By 1914, his abilities included superhuman strength, chanting incantations, appearing and disappearing, jumping to the top of the highest trees, riding on clouds, conjuring the elements (water, fire and wind), and transforming into other people or animals. His popularity caused a boom of ninjas in popular culture during the 1910s-1920s in Japan.

He is the title character of the films such as Ibun Sarutobi Sasuke (known in the west as Samurai Spy), Sânada Daisûke to Sarutobi Sasuke, Sarutobi no Ninjutsu and Sarutobi Sasuke Senjogadake no Himatsuri, as well as of several other movies simply named Sarutobi Sasuke in 1918, 1919, 1922, and 1966 (the last one also known as Ninja Spy). He is also the lead character in the musical film Brave Records of the Sanada Clan. Toei Animation's second full-length movie was Shônen Sarutobi Sasuke, dealing with Sasuke's childhood, which was followed by a TV series. This film was also the first time when both Sasuke and anime were introduced to the western audience (in 1961 as Magic Boy), although all the references to him being a ninja were removed in the English-language version. He is also the title character of an anime series Manga Sarutobi Sasuke, of the video game Ninja Boy Sasuke, and of Sanpei Shirato's 1961 manga, as well as of the manga series I am Sarutobi! by the "father of the modern manga" Osamu Tezuka two years earlier.

An adult Sarutobi Sasuke is a character in the anime and manga series Samurai Deeper Kyo, in which he serves Sanada Yukimura as the leader of the Ten Braves – the same role he has in the manga and anime Brave 10 and in the film Kamen Rider Den-O: I'm Born!. Sasuke also appeared in the historical anime and manga Shura no Toki (serving Sanada Tsubura), in the taiga drama series Tenchijin, in the anime Sanada Ten Braves and in the film Goemon. In the video game and anime series Sengoku Basara, and in its anime adaptations Sengoku Basara: The Last Party and Sengoku Basara: Samurai Kings, he is portrayed as a laid-back but cunning ninja, aiding Yukimura. In the film Shogun Assassins (Sanada Yukimura no Bouryaku), Sasuke is even shown to be literally an anthropomorphized ninja monkey. The Ninja Sentai Kakuranger character Sasuke / Ninja Red and the title character of the manga series Sarutobi Ecchan are each portrayed as being direct descendants of Sarutobi Sasuke.

The very name Sasuke has become something of a default ninja name or moniker. For example, the sports entertainment show known in the other countries as Ninja Warrior is titled Sasuke in the original Japanese version, while The Great Sasuke is stage name of the Japanese professional wrestler Masanori Murakawa. Various ninja characters by the name of either Sasuke or Sarutobi appear in the anime series Gin Tama, Haō Taikei Ryū Knight, Ninja Nonsense and Ranma ½ (Sasuke Sarugakure), the video games Captain Commando, Ehrgeiz, Joy Mech Fight (as a ninja robot), Shall We Date?: Ninja Love (as a romance option for the player character), Gotcha Force, Kessen (as a female ninja), Ninja Master's: Haō Ninpō Chō (where he is the protagonist), Samurai Warriors and Suikoden II, in the Ganbare Goemon video game series (as another robot ninja), and in the trading card game Yu-Gi-Oh!. His legacy is also almost omnipresent in the manga and anime franchise Naruto in which the father of a major supporting character, Hiruzen Sarutobi, is named Sasuke Sarutobi, hence making him the grandfather of Asuma Sarutobi (Hiruzen's son) and the great-grandfather of Konohamaru (Asuma's nephew). One of the main characters is named Sasuke Uchiha; it is mentioned that Sasuke was named after Sarutobi Sasuke in hopes that he would become a great shinobi just like him.
