= Watari (manga) =

Japanese manga series by Sanpei Shirato

- First tankōbon volume cover, published by Shogakukan

ワタリ
- Genre: Action, Drama
- Manga
- Written by: Sanpei Shirato
- Published by: Kodansha (1965–1988); Akita Shoten (1969–2010); Kodansha (1974); Shogakukan (1983-2018)
- Imprint: Shōnen Magazine Comics
- Magazine: Weekly Shōnen Magazine
- Original run: April 25, 1965 – September 10, 1967
- Volumes: 7
- Live-action film

Watari Ninja Boy
- Directed by: Sadao Funatoko
- Produced by: Hirooki Ogawa
- Written by: Shunichi Nishimura; Masaru Igami
- Music by: Hirooki Ogawa
- Studio: Toei Company
- Released: July 26, 1966
- Runtime: 86 minutes
- Budget: ¥66.54 million
- icon

Watari (Japanese: ワタリ) is a Japanese manga series written and illustrated by Sanpei Shirato. It was serialized in Kodansha's shōnen manga magazine Weekly Shōnen Magazine from April 1965 to September 1967, with its chapters collected in seven tankōbon volumes as of October 1972.

Shirato's manga has been adapted into a live-action film titled Watari Ninja Boy, was released by the Toei Company in Japanese theaters in July 1966, and was a huge box office success. It was the second most expensive film in the second half of 1965 and the first half of 1966, with ¥66.54 million budget. The film inspired numerous filmmakers to create ninjutsu period dramas with special effects technology.

== Publication ==
Watari manga first appeared on the cover of Weekly Shōnen Magazine No. 21 (May 1965), art by Sanpei Shirato.

Written and illustrated by Sanpei Shirato, Watari was serialized in Kodansha's shōnen manga magazine Weekly Shōnen Magazine in three periods with a total of 111 installments. The first period was published from April 25, 1965, issue, to February 27, 1966, issue. The second period was published from April 10, 1966, issue, to December 11, 1966, issue. The third period was published in the magazine's February 12, 1967, issue, and finished in the September 10, 1967, issue of Weekly Shōnen Magazine.

Several publishers published the series in long term, first Kodansha published seven volumes in magazine format released from July 18, 1966, to December 23, 1967, and published them in tankōbon volumes from August 10, 1972, to October 10, 1972; from November 20, 1969, to March 10, 1970, and republished it again in two other time periods, first from July 20, 1977, to November 30, 1977, and then from April 6, 1988, to August 6, 1988, in five volumes. From November 20, 1969, to March 10, 1970, Akita Shoten published Watari twice; first in Sanpei Shirato Selection volume 14 to 16, only two out of three parts that were serialized in Weekly Shōnen Magazine; and the second time in New Edition of Sanpei Shirato's Anthology in three volumes published on January 10, 2010. Shogakukan published the series four times in a new edition, first, the seven volumes from October 20, 1983, to October 20, 1984, the second time, in four bunkoban volumes from June 20, 1995, to September 20, 1995, and the third time from August 10, 1998, to September 10, 1998.

== Adaptation ==
A live-action adaptation film titled Watari Ninja Boy (Note: Japanese: 大忍術映画ワタリ, Hepburn: Daininjutsu eiga Watari) produced by Toei Company, was released in Japanese theaters on July 21, 1966. After its release, Toei Company announced that they had intention to continue making special effects films in the future, and a sequel was planned to be made as a TV series, but Sanpei Shirato, who was not satisfied with the film, rejected it, and it was quickly made into the special effects TV period drama titled Kamen no Ninja Akakage that aired from April 1967 to March 1968, based on the original work by Mitsuteru Yokoyama.

A DVD was released on November 21, 2004, by Toei Company.

=== Production ===
The film was directed by Sadao Funatoko, who shot the film version of The Samurai at Toei Kyoto in 1964, it was written by Shunichi Nishimura and Masaru Igami, who were responsible for the setting and script of The Samurai. Kaneko Yoshinobu, who plays the role Watari, was a big fan of the original manga, and was in Kyoto at the time of filming The Secret of the Urn, when he heard that Watari was being adapted into a film by Toei Company, he wanted to be in film. Kaneko had only intended to play a supporting role, but was chosen as the lead. Filming lasted three months, so Kaneko lived in Toei's women's dormitory during the filming period with her mother. The film was produced with ¥66.54 million, it was the second most expensive film in the second half of 1965 and the first half of 1966 after Miyamoto Musashi: Ganryû-jima no kettô with ¥79.66 million.

=== Influence ===
Watary inspired numerous filmmakers to create ninjutsu period dramas with special effects. At a time when period dramas were already on the decline, and with following the film's success, Watari caused many films to be made in this genre and director of the Cinematography Shigekyo Okada decided to reviving period dramas with Special effect technology and led to the production of Ogôn no tozokô, Kairyu daikessen, and Black Ninja.

== Reception ==
The Watari manga became a huge success as soon as it entered in Weekly Shōnen Magazine, and the live-action film was a huge box office success, it was the second most expensive film in the second half of 1965 and the first half of 1966.
