= Sasuke (manga) =

Japanese manga series by Sanpei Shirato

- 20th tankōbon volume cover published by Seirindō, featuring Sasuke

サスケ
- Genre: Action, Drama, Historical
- Manga
- Written by: Sanpei Shirato
- Published by: Kobunsha (1961–1966 serialized); Seirindō (1962–1965); Shueisha (1966–1967); Akita Shoten (1969–2009); Kodansha (1974); Shogakukan (1977-2006)
- Magazine: Shōnen
- Original run: July 1, 1961 – March 1, 1966
- Volumes: 20
- Anime television series
- Produced by: Kazuo Otomo
- Written by: Junji Tashiro
- Music by: Masafumi Tanaka
- Studio: TCJ
- Licensed by: NA: AnimEigo
- Original network: TBS Television
- Original run: September 3, 1968 – March 25, 1969
- Episodes: 29
- Manga
- Written by: Sanpei Shirato
- Published by: Shogakukan
- Imprint: Shōnen Sunday Comics
- Magazine: Weekly Shōnen Sunday
- Original run: July 20, 1968 – May 25, 1969

Sasuke (Japanese: サスケ) is a Japanese manga series written and illustrated by Sanpei Shirato. It was serialized in Kobunsha's Monthly magazine Shōnen from July 1961 to March 1966. A remake ran in Shogakukan's shōnen manga magazine Weekly Shōnen Sunday from July 1968 to May 1969. In 1963, the manga, together with Shirato's other series Seton's Wild Animals, won the 4th Kodansha Children's Manga Award.

TCJ produced a 29-episode anime television series adaptation that aired between September 1968 to March 1969 on TBS Television. The series was licensed for North America by AnimEigo.

== Plot ==
The story takes place in Japan at the beginning of the 17th century Edo period following the political chaos of the Sengoku period. At the time, a particularly powerful lord, Ieyasu Tokugawa, was about to take over the reins of the country. Other feudal lords fought against him, linked to Hideyori Toyotomi, including Yukimura Sanada and his ninja clan. The cream of crop of this fearsome clan were the so-called sarutobi warriors, reputed to be invincible. Despite the mastery of these warriors, the struggle for power had taken a turn favorable to Tokugawa, with his victory over his enemies and the killing of Sanada. Tokugawa instructs his right-hand man Hanzo Hattori to hunt down all the Sanadas who survived the clash, especially the sarutobi, who for him were a terrible threat. Hattori, commander of the Iga ninja clan, starts a manhunt, destined to end only when the last remaining Sanada is dead.

Among the survivors of Yukimura Sanada's clan was Daisuke Ozaru, the most fearsome of the sarutobi. Ozaru had a wife and a son, named Sasuke. Following a clash, Ozaru is injured and after a great deal of trouble, manages to return to his house disguised as a traveller. The hitmen who are chasing him catch up with him and manage to kill his wife. Little Sasuke is shocked by the death of his much-loved mother, especially because he does not know that the traveler who arrived that evening is his father, and he now thinks he is alone. Ozaru, for his part, cannot reveal his true identity. Father and son go on a dangerous but educational journey, wandering around Japan. Sasuke slowly learns from his father all the sarutobi techniques, as he encounters various opponents along the road.

== Media ==
=== Manga ===
Sasuke on the supplement cover of Shōnen May 1965 issue (left), and on main cover of No. 32 Weekly Shōnen Sunday, August 1968 (right), art by Sanpei Shirato

Written and illustrated by Sanpei Shirato, Sasuke was serialized in Kobunsha's Monthly magazine Shōnen in two periods with a total of 55 installments. The first period was published from July 1 1961 to February 1, 1965. The second period was published from the magazine's May 1, 1965, issue and finished in the March 1, 1966, issue of Shōnen.

Several publishers published the series in long term, first Seirindō published 20 tankōbon volumes as rental from July 1962 to 1965; Shueisha published 15 volumes from September 30, 1966, to April 30, 1967; Akita Shoten published Shirato's Comics anthology from December 25, 1969, to November 10, 1970, in eight volumes; Kodansha published 15 volumes from January 30, to August 5, 1974; Shogakukan republished the series four times in new edition, first, from May 10, 1990, to December 10, 1990, in eight bunkoban volumes, the second time, in ten volumes from December 10, 1995, to April 10, 1996, and in nine volumes from October 14, 2005, to June 9, 2006. It was republished again in a new edition from June 30, 2009, to October 10, 2009, by Akita Shoten.

At the same time as the anime adaptation aired, a remake of Sasuke manga by Shirato himself was serialized in Shogakukan's shōnen manga magazine Weekly Shōnen Sunday with a total of 42 installments. The manga first appeared on July 13, 1968, (Note: It appeared in the magazine's 31st issue of 1968 (cover date July 28), which was released on July 13.) and its first installment was published in the magazine's August 1968 issue on July 20, 1968. (Note: It started in the magazine's 32nd issue of 1968 (cover date August 4), which was released on July 20.) The series finished its final installment in the issue published May 25, 1969.

=== Anime ===
An anime television series adaptation produced by TCJ aired from September 1968 to March 1969 on TBS Television, with a total of 29 episodes. A Blu-ray containing all 29 episodes of the series was released in two volumes from January 26, to February 23, 2018.

On February 10, 2025, AnimEigo announced they had licensed a Sasuke anime series for a North American Blu-ray release with an English dub. It was released on October 14, 2025.

== Reception ==
In 1963, the manga, together with Shirato's other series Seton's Wild Animals, won the 4th Kodansha Children's Manga Award.
