= Ninja Bugeichō =

Japanese manga series by Sanpei Shirato

- First tankōbon volume cover, published by Shogakukan

忍者武芸帳 影丸伝 (Ninja Bugeichō: Kagemaru Den)
- Genre: Drama; Epic; Historical
- Manga
- Written by: Sanpei Shirato
- Published by: Seirindō (1959–1962); Toho (1962); Shogakukan (1966-2010)
- Original run: December 1959 – October 1962
- Volumes: 17
- Film
- Tales of the Ninja (1967)

Ninja Bugeichō: Kagemaru Den (Japanese: 忍者武芸帳 影丸伝, Hepburn: Ninja Bugeichō: Kagemaru Den; 'Ninja Martial Arts Handbook: The Legend of Kagemaru') is a Japanese manga series written and illustrated by Sanpei Shirato. It was published as kashi-hon between December 1959 and October 1962, in seventeen tankōbon volumes. The series incorporates historical materialism, realistic drawings, and allegorical themes that made it popular among the youth of the sixties.

Shirato's manga was adapted into a film, titled Tales of the Ninja, which was directed by Nagisa Ōshima and released by Oshima Productions in Japan in February 1967.

== Publication ==
Written and illustrated by Sanpei Shirato, Ninja Bugeichō was published by Seirindō as kashi-hon from December 1959 to October 1962, with a total of 17 volumes.

Toho published the last two volumes on November 20, 1962; Shogakukan published the series in long term, first published a redrawn twelve hardcover volumes in Golden Comics from August 10, 1966, to January 10, 1967; the company published a "completely restored edition" from April 25, 1970, to April 20, 1971, in nine volumes; later republished the series from April 20 to December 20, 1976, in seventeen volumes; a deluxe edition published from June 5 to July 5, 1983, in two volumes; a new edition published from June 20, 1993, to January 10, 1994, in eight volumes; and the company republished the eight volumes from June 10, 1997, to October 10, 1997; a new edition published from September 6, 2009, to May 31, 2010, in seventeen volumes.

== Themes ==
Ninja Bugeichō is a historically based ninja-themed manga that captured the attention of students and intellectuals in the 1960s. This violent epic tale set in Japan's "Warring States" (Sengoku) period was seen by many readers and critics as a thinly veiled allegory for the ongoing Anpo protests against the US-Japan Security Treaty (although Shirato himself later denied this was his intention). Regardless of Shirato's true intentions, the manga seemed to correspond to the feelings and experiences student protesters were going through at the time, and Ninja Bugeichō developed an avid following among left-leaning student activists. Because its adult themes and graphic violence, Ninja Bugeichō has been cited as one of the first examples of gekiga, or serious manga aimed specifically at adult audiences rather than children.

== Adaptation ==
A film adaptation, also titled Ninja Bugeichō in Japanese (variously translated as Tales of the Ninja or Band of Ninja in English), was directed by Nagisa Ōshima, and was released in Japan by Oshima Productions on February 15, 1967. A CD was released on September 20, 2000, by Pony Canyon; on November 29, 2008, the film released in a keep case by Books Kinokuniya; and on June 25, 2011, the company re-released the movie as a standalone. Rather than being an animated adaption, Ōshima decided to simply shoot the panels of the manga in order, adding narration and employing zooming and panning techniques.

== See also ==
- Ninjas in popular culture
