= Musashi, the Samurai Lord =

Anime and video game

- Cover artwork for the Japanese DVD release
- からくり剣豪伝ムサシロード
- Genre: Mecha
- Created by: MIND
- Written by: Tsunehisa Ito
- Directed by: Akira Shigino
- Music by: Kenji Kawai
- Country of origin: Japan
- Original language: Japanese
- No. of episodes: 50

Production
- Executive producer: Yuji Nunokawa
- Producers: Toru Horikoshi (NTV); Toshihiko Fujinami (Yomiko); Shigehiro Suzuki (Studio Pierrot)
- Production companies: Yomiko Advertising; Studio Pierrot

Original release
- Network: NNS (NTV)
- Release: October 3, 1990 – September 25, 1991

Related
- Video game
- Developer: Tose
- Publisher: Yutaka
- Platform: Game Boy
- Released: JP: April 27, 1991
- Video game
- Developer: Tose
- Publisher: Yutaka
- Platform: Famicom
- Released: JP: October 5, 1991

Musashi, the Samurai Lord, known in Japanese as Karakuri Kengō Den Musashi Lord (からくり剣豪伝ムサシロード, Karakuri Kengō Den Musashi Rōdo), is an anime series by Studio Pierrot. The 50-episode series aired on Nippon Television from October 1990 to September 1991.

The series stars, Musashi, a "gimmick robot". In the country of Zipangu every person has a gimmick robot. Musashi battles and meets his rival, Kojiro (a reference to the historical battle between Miyamoto Musashi and Sasaki Kojirō).

Two video games were released based on the anime.

== Characters ==
- Musashi (ムサシ)
- Kojiro (コジロー, Kojirō)
- Baiken (バイケン)
- Ushiwaka (ウシワカ)
- Jūbee (ジュウベエ)
- Zenigatan (ゼニガタン)
- Senhime (センヒメ)
- Ieyasu (イエヤス)
- Benkei (ベンケイ)
- Hanzou (ハンゾウ)

== See also ==
- Miyamoto Musashi in fiction
