= Young Samurai: The Way of the Sword =

2009 book by Chris Bradford

- UK front book cover
- Author: Chris Bradford
- Language: English
- Series: Young Samurai
- Genre: Children's fiction
- Published: 2009 (Puffin Books/UK); 2010 (Disney Hyperion/USA)
- Publication place: United Kingdom
- Media type: Print (Paperback)
- ISBN: 978-0-14-132431-9
- Preceded by: Young Samurai: The Way of the Warrior
- Followed by: Young Samurai: The Way of the Dragon

Young Samurai: The Way of the Sword is a children's historical novel by Chris Bradford, published in 2009. It is the second in a series of action-adventure stories set in 17th century Japan following the exploits of an English boy, Jack Fletcher, as he strives to be the first gaijin samurai.

The first book is titled Young Samurai: The Way of the Warrior (2008) and the third in the series is Young Samurai: The Way of the Dragon (2010).

== Plot ==
After a vicious ninja attack left him orphaned and stranded in Japan, Jack Fletcher managed to complete his first year of samurai school. Still, his troubles are far from over. The prejudice of his Japanese classmates has gained him dangerous enemies within his school, and Dragon Eye—the ninja who killed his father—is still after him. Jack's only hope of defeating them lies in surviving the Circle of Three: an ancient ritual that tests a samurai's courage, skill, and spirit to the limit. For most, gaining entry into the Circle means honor and glory but, for Jack, it is literally a matter of life or death.

The winner will be trained in the Two Heavens—the formidable sword technique of the great samurai, Masamoto. Learning this secret is the only hope Jack has of protecting his father's Rutter—the invaluable navigation guide of the world's uncharted oceans—from Dragon Eye. Forced into a deadly battle, Jack's going to have to master the Way of the Sword. And his time is running out.

== Characters ==
- Jack Fletcher - hero of the Young Samurai series
- Akiko – daughter of Dāte Hiroko and niece of Masamoto
- Yamato – second son of Masamoto
- Masamoto Takeshi – samurai swordmaster and founder of the Niten Ichi-Ryū school
- Dokugan Ryu – Dragon Eye, one-eyed ninja and Jack's sworn enemy
- Sensei Kano - sensei of Bōjutsu
- Sensei Hosokawa– sensei of Kenjutsu
- Kamakura Katsuro – daimyō of Edo (Tokyo) and founder of the Yagyu school
- Kazuki – student rival of Jack
- Hiroto – accomplice of Kazuki and member of the Scorpion Gang
- Moriko – black-teethed girl samurai from rival Yagyu School
- Sensei Kyuzo – sensei of Taijutsu
- Saburo – the talkative friend of Jack
- Takatomi Hideaki – daimyo of Kyoto and governs Japan on behalf of the Emperor
- Sensei Yamada – sensei of Zen
- Yori – the quiet, mouse-like friend of Jack
- Sensei Yosa – sensei of Kyujutsu - female

== Publication history ==
Publishing rights to the first three books in the Young Samurai series were acquired by Puffin Books in a three-way auction in 2007. Disney then bought the US publishing rights in the same year in a pre-emptive deal prior to the Frankfurt Book Fair. The translation rights to the series have since been sold to over 20 different territories, including Germany, Vietnam, Poland, Netherlands and Serbia.

The first book, The Way of the Warrior, was published in the UK in August 2008 and in the US in early March 2009. The first print run in the UK sold out in less than a month. As of 2017,The Way of the Warrior has been reprinted 26 times. Seven further books followed, with a ninth - The Return of the Warrior - being published for the series' tenth anniversary in 2018.

The series has sold in excess of 1 million copies worldwide.
