= Shigeru Sugiura =

Japanese manga artist

- Born: April 3, 1908; Tokyo, Japan
- Died: April 23, 2000 (aged 92)
- Occupation: Manga artist

Shigeru Sugiura (杉浦 茂, Sugiura Shigeru; 3 April 1908 – 23 April 2000) was a Japanese manga artist famous for his surreal, nonsense gag manga.

== Career ==
After initially studying painting, Sugiura became an assistant to the manga artist Suihō Tagawa. He soon began drawing his own manga in 1933 and came to fame after World War II with a series of comedic manga for children based on stories like those of Sasuke Sarutobi, Jiraiya, and Journey to the West. Sugiura closely followed popular culture and thus his manga were also influenced by such contemporary fads as Godzilla, pro wrestling, and American science fiction films. The philosophy of his manga "is of yukai, pleasure and amusement, pursuing the path as far from seriousness as possible.... The praxis of yukai is essentially the body in free motion, and Sugiura's characters are defined by an excess of movement." The result was a visual style that was often surreal and absurd. A craftsman, Sugiura could not keep up with the mass production of manga that the shift to weekly magazines brought at the end of the 1950s, and his subsequent manga became more and more surreal, if not avant-garde, as they came to be directed at an older audience. He enjoyed a second boom in popularity from the 1970s on.

== Influence ==
Sugiura has influenced many artists in a variety of fields, including the gag manga artist Fujio Akatsuka. Enthusiastic fans include such figures as the novelist Yasutaka Tsutsui and the musician Haruomi Hosono. He is cited as the inspiration for the tanuki in Isao Takahata's anime film Pom Poko and Hayao Miyazaki made a television commercial inspired by his work.

== Select single works ==
- Appuru Jamu-kun (アップルジャム君)
- Bōken Ben-chan (冒険ベンちゃん)
- Doron Chibimaru (ドロンちび丸)
- Enban Z (円盤Z)
- Gojira (ゴジラ)
- Misutā Robotto (ミスターロボット) 1959
- Sarutobi Sasuke (猿飛佐助)
- Shōnen Jiraiya (少年児雷也)
- Shōnen saiyūki (少年西遊記)
- Sugiura Shigeru: Jiden to kaisō (杉浦茂ー自伝と回想). Chikuma Shobō, 2002. ISBN 978-4-480-88518-0 (autobiography)

== Collected works ==
- Sugiura Shigeru kessaku senshū 『杉浦茂傑作選集 怪星ガイガー・八百八狸』. Seirin Kōgeisha, 2006. ISBN 4-88379-228-5
- Sugiura Shigeru mangakan『杉浦茂マンガ館』, 5 vols. Chikuma Shobō, 1993–6. ISBN 4-480-70141-9, ISBN 4-480-70142-7, ISBN 4-480-70143-5, ISBN 4-480-70144-3, ISBN 4-480-70145-1
- Sugiura Shigeru no chotto tarinai meisaku gekijō『杉浦茂のちょっとタリない名作劇場』. Chikuma Shobō, 1993. ISBN 4-480-87227-2
