= Dorinbo =

Dorinbo (c. late 16th century) was a Japanese priest and the uncle of the famous swordsman Miyamoto Musashi during the 17th century in Edo period Japan. He raised Musashi as a youth, and taught him basic knowledge of painting and religion.
