= Seton's Wild Animals =

Japanese manga series

シートン動物記 (Shīton Dōbutsuki)
- Genre: Wildlife
- Manga
- Written by: Sanpei Shirato
- Published by: Shogakukan
- Original run: June 1961 – 1963
- Volumes: 3
- Manga

Grizzly Bear Story
- Written by: Sanpei Shirato
- Published by: Seirindō
- Published: 1964
- Volumes: 2

Seton's Wild Animals (Japanese: シートン動物記, Hepburn: Shīton Dōbutsuki) is a Japanese manga series written and illustrated by Sanpei Shirato published in two parts: three volumes published by Shogakukan from 1961 to 1962, and two volumes published by Seirindō in 1964 under the title Grizzly Bear Story (灰色熊の伝記, Haiiroguma no Denki). All five volumes were based on works by noted author and wildlife artist Ernest Seton, and used text written by Kenji Uchiyama (who translated all of Seton's work into Japanese).

In 1963, the manga, together with Shirato's other series Sasuke (サスケ), won the 4th Kodansha Children's Manga Award.

== Titles ==
In addition to the volumes listed below, Shogakukan published in 1999 a set of two volumes containing the entire series.

- Seton's Wild Animals Part 1: Fenibonku no Yamaneko (フェニボンクの山ネコ) (in 6th Grade Student (小学六年生, Shōgaku Rokunensei), June - August 1961, Shogakukan)
- Seton's Wild Animals Part 2: Uosuka to Akagashira no Ko Ōkami (ウォスカと赤頭の子おおかみ) (in 6th Grade Student, September - December 1961, Shogakukan)
- Seton's Wild Animals Part 3: Supuringuhīrudo no Kitsune (スプリングヒールドのきつね) (in 6th Grade Student, January - March 1962, Shogakukan)
- Grizzly Bear Story (2 volumes, 1964, published by Seirindō)
