= Young Samurai =

Series of martial arts/action-adventure stories written by Chris Bradford

Young Samurai is a series of martial arts/action-adventure stories written by Chris Bradford, set in 17th century Japan, following the exploits of an English boy, Jack Fletcher, as he strives to be the first gaijin samurai. Introduced by Puffin Books as their "All New Action Hero", Young Samurai has been described as a black-belt Young Bond, Artemis Fowl with swords or Percy Jackson with ninja.

The first Young Samurai book, The Way of the Warrior, was published by Puffin in 2008. Disney bought the U.S. publishing rights in the same year and had published the book in early March 2009. By the time of publication in the UK, the Young Samurai series had sold to over 16 different territories. The TV and film rights have been acquired by Coolabi.

== Novels ==
1. Young Samurai: The Way of the Warrior (2008)
2. Young Samurai: The Way of the Sword (2009)
3. Young Samurai: The Way of the Fire (Short story) (2012)
4. Young Samurai: The Way of the Dragon (2010)
5. Young Samurai: The Ring of Earth (2010)
6. Young Samurai: The Ring of Water (2011)
7. Young Samurai: The Ring of Fire (2011)
8. Young Samurai: The Ring of Wind (March 2012)
9. Young Samurai: The Ring of Sky (August 2012)
10. Young Samurai: The Return of the Warrior (September 2019)
