= Sanpei Shirato =

Japanese manga artist (1932–2021)

- 白土 三平
- Born: Noboru Okamoto; February 15, 1932; Tokyo, Japan
- Died: October 8, 2021 (aged 89); Tokyo, Japan
- Occupations: Manga artist, essayist
- Years active: 1957–2021
- Notable work: Ninja Bugeichō; Kamui Den; Sasuke; Watari; Seton's Wild Animals
- Awards: 4th Kodansha Children's Manga Award

Noboru Okamoto (Japanese: 岡本 登, Hepburn: Okamoto Noboru; February 15, 1932 – October 8, 2021), known by the pen name Sanpei Shirato (白土 三平, Shirato Sanpei), was a Japanese manga artist and essayist known for his social criticism as well as the realism of his drawing style and the characters in his scenarios. He is considered a pioneer of the controversial gekiga genre of adult-oriented manga.

The son of the Japanese proletarian painter Toki Okamoto, his dream to become an artist equal with his father started when he became a kamishibai artist. He is also known for his work published in the early issues of the manga anthology magazine Garo in 1964, which he began publishing so as to serialize his comic Kamui.

== Life ==
=== Early life ===
Shirato was born in Tokyo, Japan, to painter Tōki Okamoto. In Shirato's childhood, his father was active in the proletarian culture movement and contributed, among others, to the satirical magazine Tokyo Puck. During World War II, his father faced prosecution due to his leftist beliefs. He saw the tortured corpse of proletarian leader Takiji Kobayashi in 1933 and created a painting of his death mask. As Shirato grew up, he experienced the rancor of the war years, and it is said that these grim emotions come out in the nihilistic society portrayed in his works.

Shirato developed his artistic style through painting picture-card shows (kamishibai) after finishing middle school at 18. He was influenced by the ukiyo-e of the pre-Meiji period, but differed in his portrayal of action in a multi-panel "slow motion" style unique to his manga. His style of action portrayal came from the tension building techniques inherent in the performance aspect of kamishibai.

=== Manga career ===
Shirato started his career as a professional manga artist in 1957 in the kashi-hon market. At first, he created commercial shōjo manga, depicting themes like racism in Japan and the atomic bombings of Hiroshima and Nagasaki.

From 1959 until 1962, he published Ninja Bugeichō (Ninja Martial Arts Handbook), a historically based ninja-themed manga that captured the attention of students and intellectuals of the time. This violent epic tale set in Japan's "Warring States" (Sengoku) period was seen by many readers and critics as a thinly veiled allegory for the ongoing Anpo protests against the US-Japan Security Treaty (although Shirato himself later denied this was his intention). Regardless of Shirato's true intentions, the manga seemed to correspond to the feelings and experiences student protesters were going through at the time, and Ninja Bugeichō developed an avid following among left-leaning student activists. Because its adult themes and graphic violence, Ninja Bugeichō has been cited as one of the first examples of gekiga, or serious manga aimed specifically at adult audiences rather than children.

Together with Katsuichi Nagai, in 1964 he co-founded the manga magazine Garo, which became an important platform for gekiga and alternative manga in general. Shirato served as an editor in the first years of the magazine. Kamui Den, the first series published in Garo, can be considered his most important manga work. It is the story of Kamui, a ninja who leaves an organization that pursues him and clearly sees the true nature of the Edo period and the discrimination that existed in the feudal system. Shirato's works are primarily historical dramas that focus on ninja, present a historical record of Japan, and criticize oppression, discrimination, and exploitation.

Shirato founded the production company Akame ("Red Eyes"), which worked with Goseki Kojima, his brother Tetsuji Okamoto, Haruo Koyama and others. They created a community space for manga artists.

=== Death ===
He died on October 8, 2021, at the age of 89 due to aspiration pneumonia. The news of his death was announced by the editorial department of Big Comic on October 26, 2021. It was also reported that his brother Tetsuji Okamoto (岡本 鉄二氏, Okamoto Tetsuji) died four days later of interstitial pneumonia.

== Reception and legacy ==
Some of Shirato's work have been adapted as anime series and films, including Ninja Bugeichō, adapted by Nagisa Oshima as Band of Ninja in 1967, an unusual film consisting only of images from the manga and voiceovers with no animation. His manga Sasuke was adapted into an anime series from 1968 until 1969.

Some works have received attention in the United States, such as Kamui Gaiden (1982–2000), which was partially translated in 1987 by Viz Media as The Legend of Kamui, but most of his work remain relatively unknown outside Japan.

In 1963, he won the Kodansha Children's Manga Award for Seton's Wild Animals and Sasuke.

Shirato had a big influence on other manga artists, among them Hayao Miyazaki, Masashi Kishimoto and Yōko Kondō, and American comic artist Geof Darrow. Manga critic Natsume Fusanosuke says his influence on manga history is on par with Osamu Tezuka, Shotaro Ishinomori and Takao Saito for creating new standards in the manga industry with his production company. Gekiga artist Goseki Kojima worked as an assistant for Shirato.

== Works ==
Title	Year	Notes	Refs
Kogarashi Kenshi (こがらし剣士)	1957		
Shiryō (死霊)	1958		
Kieyuku Shōjo (消え行く少女)	1959		
Ninja Bugeichō (忍者武芸帳)	1959–1962	Published by Sanyōsha in 17 vol.	
Kaze no Ishimaru (風の石丸)	1960		
Seton's Wild Animals (シートン動物記, Shīton Dōbutsuki)	1961–1962	Serialized in Shōgaku Rokunensei; Published by Shogakukan in 3 vol.	
Sasuke (サスケ)	1961–1967	Serialized in Shōnen; Published by Seirindō in 20 vol.	
Haiiroguma no Denki (灰色熊の伝記)	1964	Published by Seirindō in 2 vol.	
Kamui Den (カムイ伝)	1964–1971	Serialized in Garo; Published by Seirindō in 21 vol.	
Watari (ワタリ)	1965–1966	Serialized in Weekly Shōnen Magazine; Published by Kodansha in 7 vol.	
The Legend of Kamui (カムイ外伝, Kamui Gaiden)	1965–1967	Serialized in Weekly Shōnen Sunday; Published by Shogakukan in 2 vol.	
Shinwa Densetsu Series (神話伝説シリーズ)	1974–1980	Serialized in Big Gold and Big Comic	
Josei Series (女星シリーズ)	1979–1981	Serialized in Big Comic	
Kamui Gaiden Dai-ni-bu (カムイ外伝 第二部)	1982–1987	Serialized in Big Comic; Published by Shogakukan in 20 vol.	
Kamui Den Dai-ni-bu (カムイ伝 第二部)	1988–2000	Illustrated by Tetsuji Okamoto; Serialized in Big Comic; Published by Shogakukan in 22 vol.	
