= Young Samurai: The Way of the Warrior =

2008 book by Chris Bradford

- Author: Chris Bradford
- Language: English
- Series: Young Samurai
- Genre: Children's fiction
- Publisher: Puffin Books
- Publication date: 8 August 2008
- Publication place: United Kingdom
- Media type: Print
- ISBN: 978-0-141-32430-2
- Followed by: Young Samurai: The Way of the Sword

Young Samurai: The Way of the Warrior is a children's historical novel by Chris Bradford, published in 2008. It is the first in a series of action-adventure stories set in 17th century Japan following the exploits of an English boy, Jack Fletcher, as he strives to be the first gaijin samurai.

Young Samurai has been described as a black belt Young Bond, Artemis Fowl with swords, and Percy Jackson with ninja. The book is the first in a 9-part series. The book has received over 20 children's book award nominations and wins, and was named one of Puffin's 70 Best Ever Books.

== Plot summary ==
Masamoto Tenno, the oldest son of Masamoto Takeshi, is killed in 1609 in Toba by the feared ninja Dokugan Ryu, also known as Dragon Eye. Two years later a ship, the Alexandria, is caught in a storm along the Japanese coast. On board is Jack Fletcher, a 12-year-old English boy. When the ship hits a coral reef and is shipwrecked, his father, John Fletcher, who is pilot, sails the ship into a bay. There, the crew attempts to repair the ship as fast as possible, fearing an attack by the Wako, ruthless Japanese pirates.

When the ship is ready to sail again, someone spots a pirate ship in the distance. That night all lights are out. Jack doesn't feel at ease and takes a look on the deck. There he sees men dressed in black and hurries to warn his father. His father tells him to stay in the cabin until he comes back, but when Jack hears his father scream he runs to the deck. There his father is surrounded by men dressed in black. One of them takes Jack and threatens to kill him unless John tells him where the rutter is. John tells them in the hope they will let his son live, but the ninja don't seem to share his hope. When they are about to kill Jack, John manages to save him, but gets killed himself. As he is dying he tells Jack to take the rutter before the ninja can find it and escape from the ship. Jack manages to find the rutter but is confronted by the ninja who killed his father. Jack tries to escape and when he reaches the deck, the ship blows up, throwing him into the ocean.

Jack is later found by Masamoto Takeshi and taken to his sister Hiroko's house. There Jack is treated. When he wakes up, Jack hears voices in the room next door. He accidentally falls through the paper door and is threatened by a samurai. Following the advice he once got from a fellow sailor he bows as deep as possible, amusing the samurai.

After a few days living in the house, Jack grows discontented and tries to escape. He fails and is eventually caught by Taka. He also meets Date Akiko, the daughter of Hiroko.

Later Jack is taken to an island where the rest of the village has gathered. A duel is about to take place and Jack recognises one of the competitors as his rescuer, Masamoto Takeshi. Masamoto wins the duel and takes Jack back to the house. There he interrogates him through a translator, a Portuguese priest named Father Lucius. When Jack tells them about the murderer of his father, Masamoto realises it is Dokugan Ryu. Masamoto feels guilty towards Jack for not being able to kill the ninja, so he adopts Jack as his son until he has reached maturity. He also returns the rutter to Jack, seeing it is important to the boy. The Portuguese priest is curious about the book, but Jack lies to him about it, saying it is his father's diary.

As it seemed that Jack will stay in Japan, the Portuguese priest is ordered to teach Jack the language. Not much later Masamoto is to return to Kyoto because his school needs him. He leaves his youngest son Yamato in Toba so he and Jack can become friends, though Yamato clearly doesn't want that. When Yamato is practising with a bokken, Jack sees his chance to learn how to fight with a sword and asks Yamato to teach him. Seeing a chance to humiliate Jack, Yamato agrees. They compete at randori and Yamato always wins. When Jack finally manages to get a draw, he is called to Father Lucius, who is dying.

Lucius reveals to Jack that someone is after him and asks a favour of him; to bring his self-written dictionary to Diego Bobadilla in Osaka.

Later, Jack tells Akiko about what father Lucius had said. Akiko advises him to tell someone, but Jack decides against it, because he thinks nobody would believe him.

Jack spends the next few months recovering and learning to speak and write from Father Lucius. A samurai comes with a message saying that Masamoto will return to Toba soon. The evening before Masamoto's arrival, the house is attacked by ninja, including Dokugan Ryu. Dokugan Ryu asks Jack where the rutter is, but Jack denies knowing about its whereabouts. Before Dokugan Ryu can do anything Masamoto arrives, forcing the ninja to flee.

The next day, Masamoto takes Jack, Yamato and Akiko to Kyoto so they can learn the way of the samurai at his school. There Jack makes friends, but also enemies, one of them being Oda Kazuki. Jack proves to be a talented student in the Way of the Samurai, much to the dismay of others who don't approve the idea of a gaijin learning their ways.

After the attack in Toba, Jack and Yamato had become quick friends. But when Kazuki attacked Jack and asked Yamato if he would help the gaijin Yamato backed out and started hanging out with Kazuki. When a confrontation between Jack and Kazuki ensues, involving students of another school as well, they are stopped by Masamoto and Kamakura Katsuro, the head of the Yagyu-ryu School. Kamakura challenges Masamoto to a Taryu-Jiai and Masamoto agrees. Later Masamoto is furious at Yamato for not helping Jack and the others and shaming the family name. Upset, Yamato leaves the school and joins the Yagyu-ryu.

When it is time for the Taryu-Jiai, Yamato turns out to be one of the opponents of the Yagyu-school. When it ends in a draw, Yamato and Jack are to compete against each other for the victory of the school. Whoever gets the Sword of Jade and takes it back to school wins. It is a close race, but when they are climbing next to the waterfall, Yamato can't go on and accuses him of taking away his father. Jack, who has taken the sword, says he never wanted to do that and tries to help Yamato. But Yamato refuses to listen and jumps in the waterfall. Jack jumps after him and manages to save him. Yamato apologises and asks him to be friends again. Jack agrees.

When they come back at school, Yamato carries the sword. He is about to give sword to Kamakura, but in the end he gives it to his father, admitting it was Jack who took the sword. Masamoto then tells Yamato that he has what it takes to be a student of his school and a Masamoto.

Some time after the Taryu-Jiai the Gion Matsuri Festival takes place. Jack spends the days with his friends and has a great time until he walks into a man dressed in black. The man tells him to bugger off and Jack recognises him as Dokugan Ryu. Together with his friends he follows the ninja into the Nijo-castle. There he stops Dragon Eye before he can kill Daimyō Takatomi Hideaki. Masamoto rewards Jack and his friends for his bravery, giving Jack his first swords as a gift. Jack realises he still has a long way to go until he can defeat Dokugan Ryu to avenge his father.

== Characters ==
- Jack Fletcher – main character of the Young Samurai series
- John Fletcher – father of Jack Fletcher, Pilot aboard the Alexandria
- Date Akiko – daughter of Dāte Hiroko and niece of Masamoto
- Masamoto Yamato – second son of Masamoto Takeshi
- Masamoto Takeshi – samurai swordmaster and founder of the Niten Ichi-ryū school
- Dokugan Ryu – Dragon Eye, one-eyed ninja and Jack's sworn enemy
- Father Lucius – Portuguese Jesuit Priest
- Sensei Hosokawa Yuudai – sensei of Kenjutsu
- Kamakura Katsuro – daimyō of Edo (Tokyo) and founder of the Yagyu school
- Oda Kazuki – student rival of Jack
- Sensei Kyuzo Isamu – sensei of Taijutsu
- Saburo – the talkative friend of Jack who eats a lot and is headstrong
- Takatomi Hideaki – daimyō of Kyoto and governs Japan on behalf of the Emperor
- Masamoto Tenno – first son of Masamoto Takeshi
- Sensei Yamada Izumi – sensei of Zen
- Yori – the quiet, mouse-like friend of Jack who has a surprising talent in Zen Class and is a favourite of Sensei Yamada
- Sensei Yosa Hoshi – sensei of Kyujutsu (Way of the bow)- female

== Publication history ==
Publishing rights to the first three books in the Young Samurai series were acquired by Puffin Books in a three-way auction in 2007. Disney then bought the US publishing rights in the same year in a pre-emptive deal prior to the Frankfurt Book Fair. The translation rights to the series have since been sold to over 20 different territories, including Germany, Vietnam, Poland, Netherlands and Serbia.

The first book, The Way of the Warrior, was published in the UK in August 2008 and in the US in early March 2009. The first print run in the UK sold out in less than a month. As of 2017,The Way of the Warrior has been reprinted 26 times. Seven further books followed, with a ninth - The Return of the Warrior - being published for the series' tenth anniversary in 2018.

The series has sold in excess of 1 million copies worldwide.

== Book Awards ==
The Way of the Warrior has garnered more than 20 children's book award nominations and wins, including the Northern Ireland Book Award 2011. For the 70th anniversary of Puffin Books, The Way of the Warrior was deemed one of Puffin's 70 Best Ever Books, alongside Treasure Island and Robin Hood.

== Film and TV ==
Since publication, there has been regular interest in adapting Young Samurai into a movie or TV series. Dramatic rights were originally acquired by UK production company, Coolabi. Rights were then snapped up by Purple Pictures who developed a TV series in partnership with ITV based on book 9 of the book series. This reached pre-production stage but stalled after another ITV project took priority. Dramatic rights returned to the author.
