= Chris Bradford =

English author and martial artist

- Born: June 23, 1973 (age 53); Aylesbury, England
- Occupation: Author
- Writing career
- Genres: venture/action, children's, Young adult fiction, thriller, historical fiction
- Notable work: Young Samurai
- Website: www.chrisbradford.co.uk

Chris Bradford is an English author and black belt martial artist, best known for his children's fictional series, Young Samurai.

The first Young Samurai book, The Way of the Warrior, was published by Puffin Books in 2008. Disney bought the rights in the same year and published in early 2009. Seven further books followed, with a ninth - The Return of the Warrior - being published for the series' tenth anniversary in 2018.

In 2013, Bradford published the first book in his Bodyguard series, Hostage. The first book involves a young teenage bodyguard Connor Reeves assigned to protect the daughter of the US president.

The second book, Ransom, was a Top Ten bestseller in the UK and followed Connor on a mission protecting twin daughters on a super-luxury yacht against Somali pirates. At an event in Abingdon in 2013, Bradford revealed that there are six books planned in the series, with an overarching conspiracy hinted at in the first book.

Bradford has also written a number of books on the music business, including the critically acclaimed Heart & Soul: Revealing the Craft of Songwriting (Sanctuary, 2005).

He regularly visits schools promoting literacy and giving martial arts demonstrations to students.

== Method writing ==
As an author, Bradford employs a technique he terms ‘method-writing’. In an interview, Bradford explained, "This enables me to write very authentic and action packed novels. Furthermore, it allows me to create very dynamic and involving events around my books where I can demonstrate martial arts techniques and teach readers crucial bodyguard skills – just like the heroes and heroines of my books."

== Touring ==
Bradford stages events that involve samurai sword displays, martial arts demonstrations, bodyguard training and interactive multi-media reading. John Lloyd, Events Manager at Waterstones, Bath, considered Bradford's event as "One of the most unparalleled book events of the year."

Bradford tours over three months of the year and has visited more than 1500 schools, 50 book festivals and 25 countries. He performs two shows: "Bodyguard" and "Samurai".

== Martial arts ==
Bradford joined a judo club at the age of eight years and has since trained in ten different styles of martial arts including Shotokan karate, Muay Thai, iaido and taijutsu in which he is a black belt. His wide-ranging experience in martial arts has helped him write the Young Samurai books and create authentic fight scenes in his novels that have been praised for both their excitement and authenticity.

== Music ==
Before becoming a full-time author, Bradford was a professional songwriter, who worked with many successful musicians including Dave Calhoqoun (Ian Brown 'F.E.A.R.'); Ivor Novello winner Iain Archer (Snow Patrol); and Graham Gouldman (10cc). Bradford performed with James Blunt, at the Notting Hill Carnival and for Queen Elizabeth II.

== Awards ==
- Northern Ireland Book Award (2011), Hampshire Book Award 2014 and the Brilliant Book Award 2014
- Young Samurai: The Way of the Warrior was deemed one of Puffin's 70 Best Ever Books.

== Bibliography ==
=== Young Samurai ===
- Young Samurai: The Way of the Warrior (2008)
- Young Samurai: The Way of the Sword (2009)
- Young Samurai: The Way of the Dragon (2010)
- Young Samurai: The Way of Fire (2010 - short story)
- Young Samurai: The Ring of Earth (2010)
- Young Samurai: The Ring of Water (2011)
- Young Samurai: The Ring of Fire (2011)
- Young Samurai: The Ring of Wind (2012)
- Young Samurai: The Ring of Sky (2012)
- Young Samurai: The Return of the Warrior (2019)

=== Bodyguard (UK editions) ===
- Bodyguard 1: Hostage (2013)
- Bodyguard 2: Ransom (2014)
- Bodyguard 3: Ambush (2015)
- Bodyguard 4: Target (2016)
- Bodyguard 5: Assassin (2017)
- Bodyguard 6: Fugitive (2018)

The last 2 books are not available in the US.

=== Bodyguard (US editions) ===
The publisher Philomel Books has taken the first 4 novels and split them into 2 each, so the original 1-4 books now number 1-8, e.g. (UK) #1 Hostage = (USA) #1 Recruit + #2 Hostage.

- Bodyguard 1: Recruit (2017)
- Bodyguard 2: Hostage (2017)
- Bodyguard 3: Hijack (2017)
- Bodyguard 4: Ransom (2017)
- Bodyguard 5: Ambush (2017)
- Bodyguard 6: Survival (2017)
- Bodyguard 7: Target (2018)
- Bodyguard 8: Traitor (2018)

=== Bodyguard Reloaded ===
The sequel to the Bodyguard series. With Buddyguard disbanded after the events of Traitor, Connor joins Guardian - a secret government unit of young spies.

- Bodyguard Reloaded 1: Kidnap (2024 German release, 2025 English release)
- Bodyguard Reloaded 2: Hijack (TBC)
- Bodyguard Reloaded 3: Siege (TBC)

=== Soul ===
- The Soul Hunters (2021)
- The Soul Prophecy (2022)
- The Soul Survivor (2023)

=== Ninja ===
- Ninja: First Mission (2011)
- Ninja: Death Touch (2012)
- Ninja: Assassin (2014)
- Shadow Warriors (2016) [omnibus edition with bonus story]

=== Bulletcatcher ===
- Bulletcatcher (2015)
- Bulletcatcher: Sniper (2016)
- Bulletcatcher: Blowback (2017)

=== Gamer ===
- Gamer (2012)
- Gamer: Virus (2018)
- Gamer: Killzone (2019)

=== Music ===
- Heart & Soul: Revealing The Craft Of Songwriting (2005)
- Artist Management OUTLOUD (2006)
- Record Deals OUTLOUD (2006)
- Music Publishing OUTLOUD (2006)
- Crash Course Songwriting (1990)
