= Twins (The Matrix) =

The Matrix characters

- The Matrix character
- Neil Rayment and Adrian Rayment as the Twins in The Matrix Reloaded
- First appearance: The Matrix Reloaded (2003)
- Last appearance: Enter the Matrix (2003)
- Created by: The Wachowskis
- Portrayed by: Adrian Rayment and Neil Rayment

In-universe information
- Alias: Ghosts
- Species: Computer programs
- Gender: Male
- Occupation: Mobsters
- Affiliation: The Merovingian

The Twins (played by identical twins Neil and Adrian Rayment) are fictional characters in the 2003 film The Matrix Reloaded. Henchmen of the Merovingian, they are "Exiles", or rogue programs that have chosen to hide in the Matrix rather than face deletion. They are believed to be older versions of Agents from the second iteration of the Matrix.

The Twins have the power of intangibility: They can take on a translucent state in which they pass through physical objects such as floors or gunfire, float through the air, and instantly reset any physical damage to their bodies or clothing. They are also the "ghosts" the Oracle explains while talking to Neo before the "Burly Brawl". In other words, their abilities as programs were still usable in exile.

== Story ==
The Twins are first seen with the Merovingian smoking a hookah in his restaurant in The Matrix Reloaded. They smirk at the fact that neither Trinity, nor Morpheus, nor Neo appear to possess the same intellect as the Merovingian. The Twins rarely speak, but when they do, it is with a slow-paced English accent, and when one speaks to the other, they usually say "we", as opposed to "I".

Later, when Morpheus and crew free the Keymaker, the Merovingian sends the Twins to kill the "Redpills" and recapture the Keymaker. They encounter Morpheus and Trinity in a parking garage and quickly demonstrate both their skill in hand-to-hand combat (using a straight razor) and their ability to become incorporeal, passing through bullets and walls harmlessly and healing injuries that they sustain while in corporeal form. Morpheus, Trinity, and the Keymaker flee in a Cadillac CTS, but they are pursued first by the Twins, then by police and by Agents.

Eventually, after a long chase along the freeway and firing upon Morpheus and company with an Heckler & Koch UMP, the Twins are dispatched by Morpheus when he causes their Cadillac Escalade EXT to overturn and explode. The explosion sends them into the air and they are last seen turning intangible. They are not seen in The Matrix Revolutions. Following Smith's takeover of the Matrix, the Twins might have been assimilated by Smith along with everyone else in the Matrix, and after Neo sacrifices himself to get rid of Smith, and the machines rebooted the Matrix, the Twins most likely returned to their service of the Merovingian.

== Video game ==
In the Enter the Matrix video game, which chronicles the events leading up to The Matrix Reloaded, the Twins are shown attempting to stop Niobe and Ghost from escaping the Merovingian's mansion via a car chase in the multi-leveled garage. In this incarnation of the characters they do not wear their trademark glasses. Their smoking, overturned vehicle can be briefly seen on an overpass at one point during the highway chase level.

== Online ==
In The Matrix Online, synthesised cheat codes based on those drunk by the Unlimit officer Beirn allowed the Merovingian to retrieve and reforge the fragmented and heavily dissipated RSIs of the Twins. His operatives were tasked with finding the partially reconstructed pieces, which were successfully secured and combined, returning the Twins to fully functional states.

== Controversy ==
At the time of the release of The Matrix Reloaded, there was some controversy from people who saw the Twins as emblematic of Hollywood's negative portrayal of characters with albinism. Several major media outlets (e.g. USA Today, MSNBC) reported on the story, and it was mentioned in a joke by late-night talk show host Jay Leno: "When is the establishment going to give the really white man a break?" Film studio Warner Bros. responded to the controversy, with a spokesperson saying, "It's not our intention to single out any group of people as villains", and "It was never our intention to position these characters as albinos", noting that the Twins have black eyebrows.

== See also ==
- Simulated reality
