= Persephone (The Matrix) =

- The Matrix character
- First appearance: The Matrix Reloaded (2003)
- Last appearance: The Matrix Online (2005)
- Created by: The Wachowskis
- Portrayed by: Monica Bellucci
- Voiced by: Monica Bellucci

In-universe information
- Species: Computer program
- Gender: Female
- Spouses: Merovingian

Persephone is a fictional character in The Matrix franchise. She is portrayed by Monica Bellucci. In the films The Matrix Reloaded and The Matrix Revolutions, Persephone is married to the Merovingian. She seems bored with her existence in the Matrix, and is dissatisfied with her husband (possibly because of his constant infidelities).

== Films ==
In The Matrix Reloaded, Persephone meets Neo, Trinity and Morpheus when they come to talk with The Merovingian, her husband. Though her husband declines to help the human resistance, Persephone offers Neo to help him if he kisses her with the same passion with which he has kissed Trinity. Reluctantly, he complies. The kiss allows Persephone to perceive Neo is truly the one. She helps him free the Keymaker. Later, she kills one of her husband's employees.

In The Matrix Revolutions, Persephone warns the Merovingian that Trinity would indeed kill everyone in Club Hel to free Neo from the Train Station, simply because she is in love. This suggests that Persephone perceives and understands love, and may be disheartened by the cynicism of her husband, who seems to be driven solely by greed and lust.

In The Matrix Resurrections, Persephone makes a quick cameo appearance through archive footage from Reloaded while Neo remembers his past adventures sixty years after bringing peace to humans and Machines. While the Merovingian and some of his henchmen are revealed to have survived The Analyst's purge over the Matrix, Persephone's status is unconfirmed.

== Enter the Matrix ==
In the video game Enter The Matrix, Persephone encounters and takes a kiss from either Niobe or Ghost (depending on whose story the player follows). She seems to be able to deduce the feelings and emotions of those she kisses, noting Niobe's love for Morpheus, or Ghost's unrequited love for Trinity. She apparently takes deep pleasure in sampling the emotions of others.

== The Matrix Online ==
In the MMO The Matrix Online, Persephone gave the location of the Assassin's hide-out to Zion operatives in a critical mission relating to the Death Of A Destroyer event.

== Cultural references ==
The character's name is taken from that of Persephone in Greek mythology, who is the daughter of Zeus and Demeter (Ceres), and whom Hades took to the underworld to be his queen. Therefore, an older version of this myth makes Persephone the daughter of the Styx. This version makes her Queen of the underworld long before the myth of Hades. This older version of the myth seems to be the one having inspired the writers. After all, The Merovingien is not called Hades and thus this particular myth is not used.

Before shooting her husband's employee in The Matrix Reloaded, Persephone wonders aloud, "How many people keep silver bullets in their gun?", implying that the employee is a werewolf. In behind-the-scenes footage, Persephone herself is compared to a "vampire that seeks after emotions" by actress Monica Bellucci.

== In popular culture ==
In a 2012 survey by Empire Cinemas, Persephone was listed among the sexiest characters in cinema.

Likewise, Nettavisen declared in 2009 that the role of Persephone qualified Monica Bellucci as one of the 25 sexiest women of all time.

== See also ==
- Simulated reality
