= Agent Smith =

Antagonist in The Matrix (film series)

Agent Smith/Smith
- The Matrix character
- Hugo Weaving as Agent Smith
- First appearance: The Matrix (1999)
- Created by: The Wachowskis
- Portrayed by: Hugo Weaving (original); Ian Bliss (as “Bane”, hijacked human); Jonathan Groff (The Matrix Resurrections); Yahya Abdul-Mateen II (The Matrix Resurrections)
- Voiced by: Christopher Corey Smith (original; The Matrix: Path of Neo); Gideon Emery (human form; The Matrix: Path of Neo); Matt McKenzie (The Animatrix); Sky Soleil (MultiVersus)

In-universe information
- Alias: Bane
- Species: Computer program Computer virus Human (while possessing Bane)
- Gender: Male
- Occupation: Agent (formerly); Virus (formerly)

Agent Smith (later simply Smith) is a fictional character and the main antagonist of The Matrix franchise. The character was primarily portrayed by Hugo Weaving in the first trilogy of films and voiced by Christopher Corey Smith in The Matrix: Path of Neo (2005), with Ian Bliss and Gideon Emery playing his human form, Bane, in the films and Path of Neo respectively. He also makes a cameo in the anime film The Animatrix (2003), voiced by Matt McKenzie. Jonathan Groff and Yahya Abdul-Mateen II portray Smith in The Matrix Resurrections (2021), the latter playing Morpheus in a dual role.

In 2008, Agent Smith was selected by Empire as the 84th Greatest Movie Character of All Time. In 2013, Weaving reprised the role for a General Electric advertisement. He is considered to be the archenemy of Neo, the main protagonist of the story.

== Overview ==
Smith began as an Agent, an AI program in the Matrix programmed to keep order within the system by terminating human simulacra that would bring instability to the simulated reality, as well as any rogue programs that no longer serve a purpose to the Machine collective. To this end, Smith and his fellow Agents possess a number of superhuman attributes from their ability to bend the rules of the Matrix. Smith manifests his physical form by inhabiting and overwriting the simulated body of a human wired into the Matrix; by moving from body to body, he can reform himself if he is "killed" (which only kills the host body) and appear virtually anywhere. He can overcome the limitations of gravity and the human body, giving him speed and strength sufficient to dodge bullets flawlessly, punch through concrete with his bare hands, jump impossible distances, and easily recover from devastating physical assaults. He and other Agents wear white dress shirts under black business suits with matching black neckties, and sunglasses with darkened rectangular lenses. They use earpiece radios that allow them to communicate with each other instantaneously and perceive the actions of other humans wired into the Matrix via a type of shared consciousness. When Smith removes his earpiece during the first film, he is left unaware of the attack on the building in which he is holding Morpheus. Smith is armed in the first film with the Desert Eagle, chambered for high-caliber .50 AE ammunition, as is standard with all Agents within the Matrix.

At the end of the first film, Smith appears to have been deleted by Neo. However, in the sequels, Smith is revealed to have been linked to Neo, which enabled him to resist being sent to the Source – the Machines' mainframe, where obsolete or malfunctioning programs are deleted. No longer an Agent, Smith is liberated from the Machines' control and exists as a renegade program that manifests himself akin to a self-replicating computer virus compared to his original Agent-based ability to inhabit a single body wired into the Matrix. Smith gains the power to copy his physical form onto any entity in the Matrix by phasing his hand into their body and spreading a black liquid that transforms them into a copy of himself, resulting in an ever-growing army of Smiths connected by a single consciousness. By copying himself onto a human redpill in the process of disconnecting from the Matrix, Smith overwrites their consciousness and takes control of their body in the real world. This is seen when Smith takes over Bane's body in The Matrix Reloaded; however, he is repelled when he attempts to do the same to Morpheus and Neo. Smith's real power comes from his ability to absorb memories and powers from his victims, human and program alike, culminating in him taking over the Oracle and fighting Neo in the final battle of the Matrix series. Neo allows himself to be overwritten during the battle, thus giving the Machines an opportunity to delete Smith and return the Matrix and its inhabitants to normal.

== Character history ==
=== The Matrix ===
In the first film, Smith is one of the three Agents sent to deal with Morpheus. When Neo manages to free Morpheus, Smith orders the dispatch of Sentinels to the Nebuchadnezzar and then interferes with Neo's escape. Neo manages to put up a fight against Smith, and narrowly escapes. Smith survives and, alongside his fellow Agents, engages in a lengthy cross-town chase. Ultimately, Smith anticipates Neo’s final destination and guns him down. However, after Neo was resurrected and has embraced his abilities as the One, Smith is overpowered by him. Neo jumps into Smith's body, seemingly destroying Smith from the inside out.

=== The Matrix Reloaded ===
As a result of his contact with Neo from the first film, Smith is "unplugged" in the second film, no longer an Agent of the system but a "free man" (without earpiece). He still possesses the abilities of an Agent, but instead of being able to jump from one human to another, he is able to copy himself over any human or program in the Matrix through direct contact; this includes humans wired into the Matrix, non-Agent programs with human forms, redpills, and other Agents. Smith retains the memories and abilities, if any, of the one over which he copies himself.

Smith copies himself onto Bane (Ian Bliss), a crew member of the Zion hovercraft Caduceus. While waiting to leave the Matrix with a message from The Oracle, Bane is attacked and overwritten by Smith, who then takes control of his body in the real world. He later sabotages the Zion fleet's defense of the city by triggering one ship's electromagnetic pulse weapon too early, knocking out the other ships and allowing the Sentinels to overrun them.

=== The Matrix Revolutions ===
Movie poster for The Matrix Revolutions, featuring some of the numerous copies of Smith

By the start of the third film, Smith has managed to copy himself over nearly every humanoid in the Matrix, giving him complete control over the "Core Network" (the underlying foundation of the inner workings of the Matrix); even the Machines cannot stop him. The Oracle explains to Neo that he and Smith have become equal in power and that Smith is Neo's negative, a result of the Matrix's equation trying to balance itself. She tells Neo that Smith will destroy both the Matrix and the real world unless he is stopped. Smith soon assimilates the Oracle, gaining her power of foresight, and later manifests reality-bending powers equivalent to Neo's, such as the ability to fly. Neo destroys the Smith controlled Bane in the real world (but not before Bane/Smith blinds him). Neo heads to Machine City to negotiate with Deus Ex Machina, agreeing to defeat Smith in exchange for peace. In the Matrix, Neo and Smith have a long and destructive battle, which ends with Neo letting Smith overwrite him. With Smith now connected to the Source as a result, the Machines are able to destroy Smith and freeing the humans and programs he had overwritten.

=== The Matrix Resurrections ===
Smith returns in The Matrix Resurrections, portrayed by Jonathan Groff. Despite his defeat at the end of The Matrix Revolutions, Smith survived destruction because Neo survived, though he lost the ability to copy himself over others, instead retaining only the abilities he possessed when he was an Agent. When the Analyst created the new version of the Matrix in order to keep Neo subdued so that the Machines' energy crisis could be solved, Smith took on a new shell in order to remain hidden. The Analyst, the creator of the new Matrix, found that Neo and Smith were bonded, and he chose to turn that bond into a 'chain': as Neo was suppressed, Smith was similarly suppressed, taking the role of Thomas Anderson's business partner, with an eye for the bottom line. Neo, in his original persona of Thomas Anderson, created a video game series based on his suppressed memories. After Neo reawakens to the Matrix, Smith regained his memories and attacked Neo, stating that he had come to like the freedom that he had been granted, and that Neo's potential return to unawareness threatened that freedom. Smith then appears at Simulatte, during Neo and Trinity's confrontation with the Analyst, saving them and aids them in fighting the Analyst's forces. Smith shoots the Analyst, causing him to vanish. Addressing Neo as Tom, Smith declares their unexpected alliance to be over, and states that the difference between the two of them is that "anyone could've been you whereas I've always been anyone." Smith then departs from his host body, leaving the man confused by the experience.

Neo also subconsciously created a version of Agent Smith in a modal influenced by his suppressed memories. This version of Agent Smith (portrayed by Yahya Abdul-Mateen II) was based upon Neo's memories of Morpheus amalgamated with his memories of the original Agent Smith, and was set free by Bugs, and became the new Morpheus.

== In other media ==
- The Matrix Online, a MMORPG (2005-2009)
- The Matrix: Path of Neo, a video game covering the events of the first three films
- MultiVersus, voiced by Sky Soleil

== Portrayal ==
French actor Jean Reno was originally offered the role of Agent Smith in The Matrix, but he declined as he was at one point of his career in which he did not want to leave his native France, unwilling to move to Australia for a four-and-a-half months shooting. Kyle MacLachlan also auditioned for the part. Hugo Weaving was ultimately cast as Smith. According to Weaving, he enjoyed playing the character because it amused him. He went to develop a neutral accent but with more specific character for the role. He wanted Smith to sound neither human nor robotic. He also said that the Wachowskis' voices influenced his voice in the film. When filming for The Matrix began, Weaving mentioned that he was excited to be a part of something that would extend him.

Following the announcement that Warner Bros. was planning a relaunch of The Matrix franchise, Hugo Weaving stated that he was open to reprising the role but only if the Wachowskis were involved. In 2019, The Matrix Resurrections was confirmed for a 2021 release, but Weaving would not be returning. Originally, Weaving was approached to reprise the role by Lana Wachowski, but he had scheduling conflicts with his involvement in Tony Kushner's theatrical adaptation of The Visit, leading Wachowski to conclude that the dates would not work and write him out from the film. Jonathan Groff was cast to replace Weaving in the role, with Yahya Abdul-Mateen II portraying a version of Smith inside a modal created by Neo.

== Reception ==
Christopher Borrelli praised the writing of Smith, noting that the character "had all the good lines", and praising Weaving's portrayal of the character as showing "refreshingly nihilistic wit".

The character has been described as a 1950s "organization man", like Sergeant Joe Friday from Dragnet.

Hugo Weaving reprised the role of Smith in a parody used for a 2013 GE General Electric advertisement, in which multiple copies of him appear throughout a hospital and the advertisement concludes with Smith offering a choice of a red or blue lollipop to a boy.

== See also ==
- Men in black
- Simulated reality
