= Nebuchadnezzar (The Matrix) =

Fictional hovercraft captained by Morpheus in the Matrix trilogy

- The Matrix vehicle
- First appearance: The Matrix
- Last appearance: The Matrix Reloaded

Information
- Affiliation: Zion
- Launched: 2069 A.D.
- Decommissioned: 28th century
- Captain: Morpheus

General characteristics
- Class: Mark III No. 11
- Armaments: Gun turret, Electromagnetic pulse
- Defenses: Armor plating
- Propulsion: Anti-gravity pads

The Nebuchadnezzar (/nɛbʊkədnɛzr/) is a fictional hovercraft captained by Morpheus in the Matrix franchise. Its name is a Biblical reference to Nebuchadnezzar II, from the Book of Daniel.

== Appearance ==
In Matrix's setting, the ship is built in 2069, prior to the Machine War that leads to the creation of the Matrix. The Nebuchadnezzar, along with other similar craft, is repurposed by the human rebels to covertly broadcast crew members' minds into the Matrix, in an effort to locate the minds of other humans and free them from the Matrix. They enter and leave the Matrix through the use of pirate radio signals sent out by the ship, which transport the crew anywhere in the Matrix that a phone line can be accessed. The ship's operator remains as a guide, sending crews navigational data and programs with which to hack into the Matrix. Two operators for the Nebuchadnezzar appear in the Matrix trilogy: Tank and Link. The craft is also equipped with defensive measures in the form of an onboard EMP, which it uses to fight flying robots known as Sentinels.

The interior of the ship is one of the few indications in the series about how the rebels live. It resembles the interior of a submarine and is made entirely of raw steel, with flashing computer screens and cramped, small sleeping quarters. The only food aboard is a nutrient-rich mixture described as "viscous, gag-eliciting goop".

The Nebuchadnezzar is destroyed by a Sentinel's tow bomb near the conclusion of The Matrix Reloaded. The crew escapes before the ship's destruction thanks to Neo's newfound ability to identify and assume limited control over Sentinel hardware using his powers as the chosen one. The crew is found by the hovercraft Mjolnir soon afterward.

== Merchandise ==
In Japan, the Matrix Ultimate Collection featured a replica model of the Nebuchadnezzar that was 60 cm in length.

== Reception ==
The Matrix and Philosophy states that the Nebuchadnezzar's name is symbolically important, as the ancient king "has a dream he can't remember but keeps searching for an answer." This is similar to how Neo continues to search for an answer to his "vague but persistent" questions about the Matrix. Additionally, the book notes that the ship's nameplate contains the words "Mark III No. 11", which alludes to the Bible verse Mark 3:11: "And, whenever the evil spirits saw him, they fell down before him and cried out, 'You are the Son of God,'" relating Neo's path to the Jesus story.

Transpersonal Management: Lessons from the Matrix Trilogy states that the name Nebuchadnezzar represents the machines' arrogance in claiming godliness, similar to the ancient king, as well as the fact that the rebels are warriors who are attempting to liberate their people. Neuroscience in Science Fiction Films calls the name symbolic of the fact that "imminent doom awaits" due to the apocalyptic nature of the Book of Daniel.
