= Niobe (The Matrix) =

Fictional character in The Matrix

- The Matrix character
- Jada Pinkett Smith portraying Niobe
- First appearance: The Matrix Reloaded (2003)
- Last appearance: The Matrix Resurrections (2021)
- Created by: The Wachowskis
- Portrayed by: Jada Pinkett Smith
- Voiced by: Jada Pinkett Smith (Enter the Matrix); Gina Torres (The Matrix Online); Kimberly Brooks (The Matrix: Path of Neo)

In-universe information
- Gender: Female
- Title(s): Captain of the Logos; General
- Significant other: Morpheus

Niobe /ˈnaɪ.ə.biː/ is a fictional character in The Matrix franchise. She is portrayed by Jada Pinkett Smith. She serves as a supporting character in the three sequels of the original film, The Matrix Reloaded, The Matrix Revolutions and The Matrix Resurrections, and one of the protagonists of the video game Enter the Matrix. Niobe also appears in the MMORPG The Matrix Online. In the game, however, Niobe's character voicing is portrayed by Gina Torres, who portrayed the minor Zion character Cas in The Matrix Reloaded and The Matrix Revolutions.

== Background ==
Niobe is a human from Zion, being one of the rebels participating in the war against the Machines and the Matrix. She is the captain and pilot of a Zion hovercraft, the Logos, the smallest (and therefore most maneuverable) ship in the human fleet with a crew of only three: herself, weapons expert and First Mate Ghost, and Operator Sparks.

Within the virtual world of the Matrix, Niobe is one of Zion's most gifted martial artists. She has killed at least one Agent, survived multiple encounters with the Merovingian's superhuman thugs, faced Seraph in one-on-one combat, and even managed to survive and escape from a confrontation with the replicating entity Smith. She is also a skilled driver as seen in The Matrix Reloaded, when she swiftly navigates a crowded network of freeways in order to save Morpheus from falling to his death off the top of a truck trailer.

In the real world, she is the most skilled pilot among the rebel forces. She demonstrates this on several occasions. In one scene during The Matrix Revolutions, she maneuvered the rather massive hovercraft Hammer through the narrow, cluttered passage of a mechanical line (while under heavy attack and pursuit by Sentinels), a feat no other pilot has successfully performed. She also performs a 270-degree flip with the hovercraft, as an evasive maneuver, which apparently no previous pilot had even attempted before. She also gave up her ship to Neo so he could go and stop the machines. When questioned about this since she did not believe in the prophecy, she responded that she did believe in Neo.

Sixty years later, an elderly Niobe is the general of the human forces and the leader of the human-Machine city Io. She is also revealed to have been the one to free Neo's new ally Bugs from the Matrix. However, she is now more focused on rebuilding and keeping her people safe, lacking much of the previous fire that she had possessed. Niobe reveals to Neo that after the war, it took her a long time to accept that they were truly safe. When Neo reminds Niobe of how she once gave up her ship to him, she simply responds that times are different now and she has him locked up until they can come to an agreement. Bugs accuses Niobe of having given up on people and to care more about rebuilding than freeing those trapped in the Matrix. However, her partner Freya points out to Niobe that she is conflicted by her actions which Niobe admits are motivated by fear. After speaking with Sati, Niobe, having regained some of her old fire, gathers her captains for a mission to rescue Trinity and they all instantly volunteer without even hearing the full explanation from Niobe, simply trusting in her judgment and leadership.

== Relationships ==
Niobe was once romantically involved with Morpheus, but their relationship broke apart after Morpheus received his revelations from the Oracle and started to preach the prophecy of the One (a prophecy Niobe has never truly believed in). After breaking up with Morpheus, Niobe eventually becomes involved with Commander Jason Locke, a taciturn, practical man who is in many ways the exact opposite of Morpheus. Both Persephone and The Oracle insinuate that Niobe is still in love with Morpheus when they confront her in Enter the Matrix.

At the end of The Matrix Revolutions, as the retreating Machine army obliged the new peace bartered by Neo, Niobe is seen embracing Morpheus, perhaps an indication of a renewal of their romance. (One reference in the Special Features also intimates that they have gotten back together.) In The Matrix Resurrections, Niobe does not reveal whether or not she and the now-deceased Morpheus ever resumed their romance, but she does speak fondly about him to Neo. Although not explicitly stated in Matrix Resurrections it is implied that Niobe is now in a domestic partnership with Io’s plant expert, Freya.

== Recognition ==
In January 2004, Pinkett Smith was nominated for an NAACP Image Award for the role of Niobe. Fellow cast member Nona Gaye also received a nod for her portrayal of Zee.

== Online ==
In Chapter 5.1 of The Matrix Online, Niobe had a meeting with fellow Zion operatives inside Bishop Imports in the International District to test out a set of chemicals that were upgrades meant for the Agent programs. After consuming the chemicals, Anome, her trusted subordinate, shoots Niobe and all Zion operatives in the meeting while an operator of his hovercraft pulls the plug on one of his surviving crewmembers who isn't in on his plot. Niobe's floor is sealed and there is no way to access her floor with both the elevator and staircase systems. During the recent set of critical missions, Ghost and redpill operatives from all parties are currently attempting to save her.

In Chapter 5.2 of The Matrix Online, Niobe was rescued chronologically after the fourth Zion critical mission. On the Recursion instance, Ghost leads a rescue team to Bishop Imports in Ueno, while the Effectuator (a program hired by the Merovingian who controls his constructs), and other redpills protect the hardline systems to facilitate the operation.

Other minor roles include briefing and de-briefing Zion operatives during missions, and rewarding Redpills with special items.

== See also ==
- Simulated reality
