= Anthony Brandon Wong =

Australian actor (born 1965)

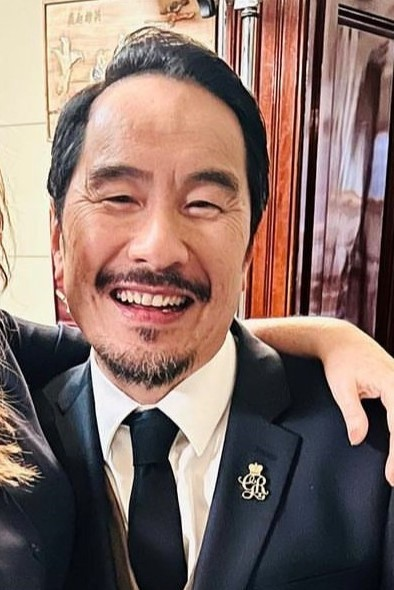
- Wong on the set of Queen of Oz
- Born: 12 May 1965 (age 61); Sydney, Australia
- Other name: Anthony Wong
- Occupation: Actor
- Years active: 1988–present

Anthony Brandon Wong (born 12 May 1965) is an Australian actor, singer-songwriter and acting teacher and coach. His roles include Ghost in The Matrix Reloaded and The Matrix Revolutions.

== Career ==
His role of Ghost from The Matrix Reloaded and The Matrix Revolutions was greatly expanded in the video game Enter the Matrix, in which he starred alongside Jada Pinkett Smith as the lead. Prior to landing his role as Ghost, he originally auditioned for Tank in the first film, but lost out to Marcus Chong.

Wong's other roles include Jumping Ship as the leader of modern-day pirates, Little Fish, two stints on Home and Away, Mek – a scientist in Spellbinder: Land of the Dragon Lord, the 2004 film Flight of the Phoenix and as Tasuke Kogo in the 2008 six-part miniseries, Samurai Girl. He played the role of Danny Law in the 2016 comedy TV series The Family Law.

In 2023, Wong starred in all six episodes of the BBC One comedy Queen of Oz. He plays Weiwei Weng, the sassy and sarcastic Master of the Household of Macquarie House, the fictitious royal residence of Queen Georgiana, played by Catherine Tate.

== Filmography ==
=== Film ===
Year	Title	Role	Notes
1991	'Til There Was You	Barman	
1992	Seeing Red	Nguyen	
1995	Singapore Sling: Midnight Orchid	Yvette	
1996	Floating Life	Gar Ming	Lead role
1996	Lilian's Story	Transvestite on bus	
2003	The Matrix Reloaded	Ghost	
2003	The Matrix Revolutions	Ghost	
2003	Flight of the Phoenix	Lead Smuggler	
2008	Crooked Business	Peter Cho	
2011	Haywire	Jiang	
2012	Guns, Girls and Gambling	Asian Elvis	
2016	Thicker Than Water	Tin	
2017	Emporium	Brady	Short film; lead role
2019	Sequin in a Blue Room	Virginia	
2020	The Invisible Man	Accident Victim	Cameo
2020	Unsound	Tristan	
2021	The Pitch	Bobby Berman	
2023	In The Room Where He Waits	Matthew	
2024	Godzilla x Kong: The New Empire	Talk Show Announcer	

=== Television ===
Year	Title	Role	Notes
1988	Swap Shop		1 episode
1988	Home and Away	David Lee	Recurring role; 6 episodes
1988	Mission: Impossible	Tu	1 episode
1989	Trouble in Paradise	Ringe	Television film
1989	Tanamera – Lion of Singapore	Miki	Miniseries; 5 episodes
1989	Bodysurfer	Dr. Wu	Miniseries; 2 episodes
1989	Cassidy	Wayne	Miniseries
1989	Fear in Fun Park	Randolph	Television film
1989	Boys from the Bush	Phoung	1 episode
1990	Embassy	Lee	3 episodes
1991	A Country Practice	Winston Yip	2 episodes
1991	Acropolis Now	Guido Mazzio	1 episode
1997	Spellbinder: Land of the Dragon Lord	Mek	Main role; 26 episodes
1997	The Adventures of Sam	Hong (voice)	1 episode
1998	Home and Away	Hai	Recurring role; 7 episodes
2001	Jumping Ship	Frakes	Television film
2008	Samurai Girl	Tasuke Kogo	Miniseries, 6 episodes
2013	Nowhere Boys	Michael	7 episodes
2015	Maximum Choppage	Le Bok	5 episodes
2017	Pulse	Arthur Chan	2 episodes
2016–2019	The Family Law	Danny Law	18 episodes
2019	The Letdown	Phil	Episode: "Heavy Heart"
2019	Reef Break	Dr Griffin	Episode: "Dream Lover"
2019	The Commons	Harlow	2 episodes
2020	First Day	John Nguyen	2 episodes
2021	Wakefield	Clive	2 episodes
2021	The Moth Effect	Politician	Episode: "Old Matey"
2022	The PM's Daughter	Tim Yeung	Miniseries
2022	Bali 2002	Dr Harry	Miniseries
2022	Upright	Richard Hodgkinson	Episode #2.1
2023	Queen of Oz	Weiwei	6 episodes
2023	One Night	Mediator	1 episode
2024	The Twelve	Winston Hang	8 episodes

=== Web ===
Year	Title	Role	Notes
2020	Ding Dong I'm Gay	Mr Carnegie	1 episode

=== Video games ===
Year	Title	Role	Notes
2003	Enter the Matrix	Ghost	

== Awards and nominations ==
Year	Award	Category	Work	Result	Ref
1992	Victorian Green Room Awards	Best Male Actor in a Leading Role	Sex Diary of an Infidel	Won	
1993	Victorian Green Room Awards	Best Supporting Actor	The Temple	Nominated	
1993	Sydney Critics Circle Awards	Best Supporting Actor in a Play	Sex Diary of an Infidel	Nominated	
2009	Victorian Green Room Awards	Best Male Performer in a Play	The Language of the Gods	Nominated	
2016	Equity Ensemble Awards	Outstanding Performance by an Ensemble Cast – Comedy Series	Maximum Choppage	Nominated	
2017	Equity Ensemble Awards	Outstanding Performance by an Ensemble Cast – Comedy Series	The Family Law	Won	
2017	Edmonton Festival of Fear International Film Festival	Best Actor – Short Film	Emporium	Nominated	
2018	Maverick Movie Awards	Best Ensemble Performance – Feature	Thicker Than Water	Nominated	
2018	Los Angeles Film Awards	Honorable Mention – Supporting Actor	Thicker Than Water	Won	
2018	Equity Ensemble Awards	Outstanding Performance by an Ensemble Cast – Comedy Series	The Family Law	Won	
2019	Asian Television Awards	Best Comedy Programme	The Family Law	Won	
2020	Equity Ensemble Awards	Outstanding Performance by an Ensemble Cast – Comedy Series	The Family Law	Won	
