= Ian Bliss =

Australian actor (born 1966)

- Born: 30 June 1966 (age 60); Sydney, New South Wales, Australia
- Education: National Institute of Dramatic Art (1993)
- Occupation: Actor
- Years active: 1991–present
- Known for: The Matrix Reloaded (2003); The Matrix Revolutions (2003); Underbelly
- Spouse: Jacqueline Brennan (m. 2001)
- Children: 2

Ian Bliss (born 30 June 1966) is an Australian film, television, and stage character actor, who has appeared in numerous Australian television dramas including Heartbreak High, Wentworth and as several characters in the Underbelly franchise, as well as his best known role as Bane in The Matrix film series.

== Early life and education ==
Bliss grew up in a creative family; his mother was a dancer and his father was a singer. After a family friend who was involved with an amateur theatre company hired Bliss for a role, he continued to work with the company throughout his school years. In addition to performance he also learned direction, stage management, set building, lighting and sound design.

After having predominantly studied the sciences at high school, Bliss undertook his senior year at a TAFE, focusing on arts and humanities, to prepare him for pursuing study in acting. He went on to university, where he studied a Bachelor of Education majoring in drama, dance and psychology. After his graduation, he secured an agent and started procuring professional acting jobs.

Bliss then auditioned for Sydney's National Institute of Dramatic Art (NIDA) at the age of 23 and was accepted into their acting course. After graduating, he registered with one of Australia's top acting agents.

== Career ==
=== Film and television ===
Bliss's first screen television appearance was a minor role in children's series Pugwall in 1991. After a part in 1994 film Country Life alongside Sam Neill, he landed the regular role of Andrew Bell in Australian drama series Heartbreak High from 1995 to 1996. Other early television credits include Cody, miniseries Blue Murder, Halifax f.p. and Big Sky, Murder Call, Good Guys, Bad Guys and Water Rats. In 1997, he played the recurring role of Kye Lyons, love interest of Isla Fisher’s character Shannon, in long-running soap opera Home and Away. He played the Peacekeeper scientist Drillic in the 2001 Farscape episode "Losing Time".

Bliss then landed his best known role as Bane and Agent Smith in The Matrix Reloaded and The Matrix Revolutions (2003), for which he was chosen by the Wachowskis because of his accurate impersonation of Hugo Weaving (Agent Smith's program form), and also his partial resemblance to Weaving.

After the Matrix sequels, Bliss appeared in local television film The Postcard Bandit and took minor roles in American blockbusters Stealth (2005) and Superman Returns (2006). He also had further television roles in Stingers, Blue Heelers, Love My Way, McLeod's Daughters and All Saints.

Bliss played the recurring role of 'Mr L' in the original Underbelly series and made an appearance in drama series Canal Road that same year. In 2010, he had a role in episode 8 of 2010 HBO miniseries The Pacific as Captain Le Francois.

He continued to make guest appearances in numerous television series before playing Senior Detective Collins in season 6 of Wentworth. He reprised the role in the final season, appearing in a total of six episodes. He also appeared in 2019 surf series Reef Break.

Bliss appeared in 2020 Underbelly adaptation Informer 3838 as Police Chief Commissioner Simon Overland, the commissioner who oversaw the gangland war issuing Taskforce Purana. This was his third appearance in the Underbelly franchise, having also appeared in the in 2014 series Fat Tony & Co as Bernie Edwards. In 2022, he joined the cast for SBS drama Safe Home, in which he played Detective O'Connor.

Bliss appeared in the 2023 horror movie Late Night with the Devil in the role of Carmichael Haig. Bliss revealed later in an interview that he originally was hired as a cast script reader for the movie's audition process and was set to play a totally different role in the film, but four days before filming began, he was asked to take over the role of Haig. In the same interview, Bliss confirmed that he would appear in the 2025 Netflix miniseries The Survivors. He played the role of Geoff Mallott.

On 5 March 2025, Bliss was announced as a nominee for Best Supporting Actor for the Australian Film Critics Association Awards for his role in Late Night with the Devil.

=== Stage ===
Bliss's theatre performances included playing the lead role in War Horse, at Sydney's Lyric Theatre. In 2015, his performance in North by Northwest for Melbourne Theatre Company won him a Green Room Award as part of the ensemble cast.

In 2023, Bliss appeared in the play My Sister Jill for Melbourne Theatre Company, again, winning a Green Room Award in 2024, as part of the ensemble cast.

=== Voiceover ===
Bliss is also a sought-after voice-over artist and has provided his voice to many animated series such as Big Words, Small Stories, Kuu Kuu Harajuku, Get Ace and SheZow.

He voiced the Bowel Cancer Australia campaigns that went to air every year from 2018. Other television commercials have included Bupa, BMW, British Paints, Spirit of Tasmania, Mercedes-Benz, Crown Lager and Victoria University.

Bliss has also narrated several audiobooks including Dinner with the Schnabels and Final Act.

== Personal life ==
Bliss has been married to actress Jacquie Brennan since 2001. They both met on the production of the theatre play Silhouette in 1999. Bliss and Brennan have two children together.

== Filmography ==
=== Film ===
Year	Title	Role	Notes
1994	Precious	Jean	Short film
1994	Country Life	David Archdale	Feature film
1999	Siam Sunset	Martin	Feature film
1999	Passion	Army Officer	Feature film
1999	Powerburn	Dex	
2000	Bound	Carter	Short film
2001	The Bank	Executive #1	Feature film
2003	The Matrix Reloaded	Bane / Agent Smith	Feature film
2003	The Long Lunch	Italo Julep	
2003	The Matrix Revolutions	Bane / Agent Smith	Feature film
2005	Man-Thing	Rodney Thibadeaux	Feature film
2005	Stealth	Lt. Aaron Shaftsbury	Feature film
2005	Danya	Patrick	Short film
2006	Superman Returns	Shuttle Commander	Feature film
2008	Playing for Charlie	Drew Hobbs	
2009	Together Alone	Vladimus	Short film
2016	Waster of Time	Time Traveller	Short film
2020	Miss Fisher and the Crypt of Tears	Vincent 'Monty' Montague	feature film
2023	Late Night with the Devil	Carmichael Haig	Feature film
TBA	The Puppet Show	TBA	Short

=== Television ===
Year	Title	Role	Notes	Ref
1991	Pugwall	Man on Phone	2 episodes	
1995	Blue Murder	Bobby Chapman	Miniseries, 2 episodes	
1995–1996	Heartbreak High	Andrew Bell	23 episodes	
1996	Halifax f.p.	Garry	Episode: "Cradle and All"	
1996–2000	Water Rats	Colin Fleetwood / Max Prescott	4 episodes	
1997	Big Sky	James McCourt	Episode: "The McCourt Family"	
1997	Home and Away	Kye Lyons	6 episodes	
1997	Murder Call	Scott McKenna	Episode: "Ashes to Ashes"	
1998	Good Guys Bad Guys	Keith McLeod	Episode: "Blood is Thicker than Walter"	
1999–2001	BackBerner	Various	11 episodes	
2000	Tales of the South Seas		Episode: "Blackbirding"	
2000–2003	Stingers	Nick Lynch / Masely / Marty Stockwell	3 episodes	
2001	Farscape	PK Scientist Drillic	Episode: "Losing Time"	
2002	The Lost World	Professor Hamilton	Episode: "Suspicion"	
2002	Bootleg	Darius Crowe	3 episodes	
2002–2007	All Saints	Kevin Maguire / Jimmy 'Buzz' Beasley	7 episodes	
2003	The Postcard Bandit	Potter	TV movie	
2003	Blue Heelers	Dave Williams	Episode: "Safety Last"	
2003	Making Time	Col Bryant	TV movie	
2004–2006	Love My Way	Darren Longman	4 episodes	
2005–2007	McLeod's Daughters	Detective Christopher Montello	2 episodes	
2006	Tripping Over	Ken	4 episodes	
2007	The Catalpa Rescue	John Breslin	TV movie	
2007	Gumnutz: A Juicy Tale	Larry / Peer Point J. Marino (voice)	TV movie	
2007–2010	City Homicide	Lance Hardwick / Toby Hendricks	2 episodes	
2008	Underbelly	Thomas Hentschel (Mr.L in original broadcast)	6 episodes	
2008	Canal Road	Bradley Thompson	1 episode	
2008	Very Small Business	Tony Orsini	5 episodes	
2008	Monash: The Forgotten Anzac	Charles Bean	TV movie	
2009	Dirt Game	Bart	Episode: "Boab Dreaming"	
2009	Rush	Ollie Godard	1 episode	
2010	The Pacific	Capt. Le Francois	Miniseries, episode: "Iwo Jima"	
2011	Killing Time	Detective Inspector Patterson	2 episodes	
2011	Twentysomething	Auctioneer	Episode: "Lost and Found"	
2011	Crownies	Inspector Red Bindall	1 episode	
2012	Underground: The Julian Assange Story	Vince	TV movie	
2013	The Doctor Blake Mysteries	Keith Morrisey	Episode: "Still Water"	
2013	Mr & Mrs Murder	Robin Boydell	Episode: "A Dog's Life"	
2014	Fat Tony & Co.	Bernie Edwards	Miniseries, 2 episodes	
2014	The Time of Our Lives	Tony Bridges	Episode: "The Negotiation"	
2014	Get Ace	Professor Pringle (voice)	9 episodes	
2014	ANZAC Girls	Colonel Constantine de Crespigny	Episode: "Love"	
2014	It's a Date	Alan	1 episode	
2015	Gallipoli	Colonel Brazier	Miniseries, episode: "The Breakout"	
2015–2018	Kuu Kuu Harajuku	Commander Bo-ring / General No Fun / Various (voice roles)	156 episodes	
2016	Wanted	Luke Delaney	2 episodes	
2016	Hunters	Burton	Episode: "The Beginning & the End"	
2016	Winners & Losers	Colin Gammell	2 episodes	
2016	The Wrong Girl	Gareth	1 episode	
2017	Sherazade: The Untold Stories	Yunan (voice)	5 episodes	
2018	Olivia Newton-John: Hopelessly Devoted to You	Val Guest (uncredited)	Miniseries, 1 episode	
2018	Wrong Kind of Black	Police Officer 1	4 episodes	
2018–2021	Wentworth	Senior Detective Collins	6 episodes	
2019	Reef Break	Jones	Episode: "The Hohenzollern Collection"	
2020	Informer 3838	Simon Overland	2 episodes	
2021	Fires	Gary Saunders	1 episode	
2021	Big Words, Small Stories	Grandpa Rex, Chaz, Various (voices)	65 episodes	
2021	Harrow	Charlie Oberg	1 episode	
2023	Safe Home	Detective O'Connor	4 episodes	
2023	Utopia	Doug	1 episode	
2025	The Survivors	Geoff Mallott	5 episodes	

=== Audio books ===
Year	Title	Role	Notes
2016	Clade	Narrator	Author: James Bradley
2021	Final Act	Narrator	Author: Sarah Bailey
2022	Dinner with the Schnabels	Narrator	Author: Tony Jordan

=== Video games ===
Year	Title	Role	Notes
2003	Enter the Matrix	Bane / Agent Smith	Video game

== Theatre ==
Year	Title	Role	Notes	Ref
	Journey's End	Stanhope	Melbourne Athenaeum	
1994	The Happy Prince	Mayor	Theatre of Image	
	Lone Star	Cletis	Sons of the Desert Theatre Company	
1997	Jake and Pete	Crow / Snake	Theatre of Image	
1999	Silhouette	Detective Inspector Brunton	Marian St Theatre, Sydney	
2001–2008	Jake and Pete	Crow / Snake	International tour	
2009	Savage River	Kingsley	Stables Theatre, Sydney with Griffin Theatre Company, MTC & Tasmanian Theatre Company	
2010	Richard III	Clarence / Ratcliff	Sumner Theatre, Melbourne with MTC	
2011	Hamlet	Marcellus	Sumner Theatre, Melbourne with MTC	
2011	Apologia	Peter	Arts Centre Melbourne with MTC	
2013	War Horse	Ted Narracott / Colonel Strauss	AustralIan tour with National Theatre of Great Britain	
2014–2015	North By Northwest	Budnikov	Melbourne Theatre Company	
2016; 2018	Jasper Jones	Mr Bucktin / Warwick	Melbourne Theatre Company, Queensland Theatre Company	
2017	Dream Lover	Ensemble	Arts Centre Melbourne with Gordon Frost Organisation	
2023	My Sister Jill	Jack	Southbank Theatre, Melbourne with MTC	
2025	The Black Woman of Gippsland	Sergeant / Ensemble	Melbourne Theatre Company	
2027	Every Second Wednesday	Matthew	Melbourne Theatre Co	

== Awards ==
Year	Title	Award	Category	Result	Ref
2015	North By Northwest	Green Room Awards	Best Ensemble	Won	
2017	Jasper Jones	Helpmann Awards	Best Play	Nominated	
2017	Jasper Jones	Green Room Awards	Best Production	Nominated	
2017	Jasper Jones	Green Room Awards	Best Ensemble	Nominated	
2018	Wentworth	AACTA Awards	Best Drama Series	Nominated	
2018	Wentworth	Logie Awards	Most Popular Drama Program	Won	
2018	Dream Lover	Helpmann Awards	Best Musical	Nominated	
2020	Wentworth	AACTA Awards	Best Drama Series	Nominated	
2024	My Sister Jill	Green Room Awards	Best Production	Won	
2024	My Sister Jill	Green Room Awards	Best Ensemble	Won	
2025	Late Night with the Devil	Australian Film Critics Association Awards	Best Supporting Actor	Nominated	
