= Morpheus (The Matrix) =

Fictional character in The Matrix

- The Matrix character
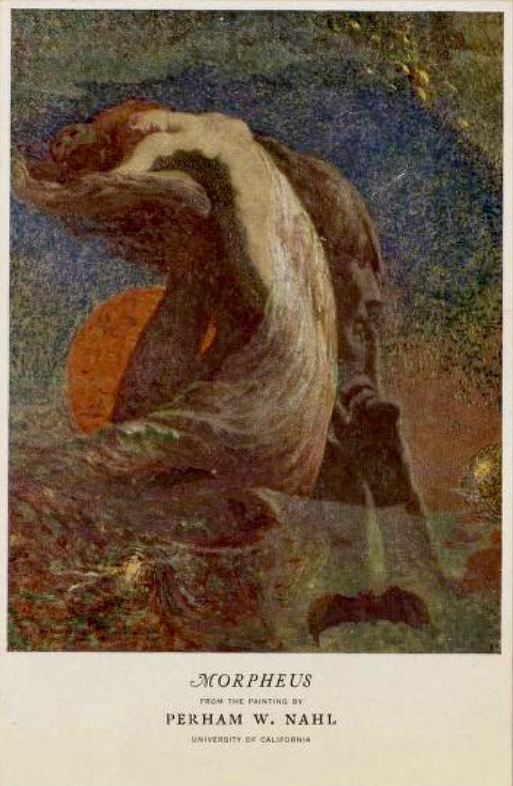
- First appearance: The Matrix (1999)
- Last appearance: The Matrix Resurrections (2021)
- Created by: The Wachowskis
- Portrayed by: Laurence Fishburne; Yahya Abdul-Mateen II (Resurrections)
- Voiced by: Laurence Fishburne

In-universe information
- Gender: Male
- Title: Captain of Nebuchadnezzar
- Fighting style: Budo; Krav Maga; Wushu; Jeet Kune Do
- Significant other: Niobe

Morpheus (/ˈmɔːrfiəs/) is a fictional character in The Matrix franchise. He is portrayed by Laurence Fishburne in the first three films, and in the video game The Matrix: Path of Neo, where he was the only original actor to reprise his character's voice. In The Matrix Resurrections, an AI program based on him is portrayed by Yahya Abdul-Mateen II.

== Concept and creation ==
The Wachowskis, the creators of The Matrix franchise, instructed Fishburne to base his performance on Morpheus, a character in Neil Gaiman's comic book series The Sandman. At the studio's request, Gaiman later wrote "Goliath", a promotional short story set in the film's universe.

The name Morpheus is that of the god of dreams in Greek mythology, which is consistent with the character's involvement with the "dreaming" of the Matrix. The mythical Morpheus and his family, including two brothers (Phobetor and Phantasos), lived in a dream world protected by the Gates of Morpheus with two monsters standing guard. Beyond the gates were the River of Forgetfulness, beside which Morpheus once carried his father to hide in a cave, and the River of Oblivion. This theme of duality carries over to Morpheus in The Matrix, who offers Neo either a blue pill (to forget about the Matrix and continue to live in the world of illusion) or a red pill (to enter the painful world of reality).

Fishburne did not reprise his role in the 2021 The Matrix Resurrections film. He stated that, "I am not in the next Matrix movie, and you'd have to ask Lana Wachowski why, because I don't have an answer for that". Both Vulture and Polygon highlighted that the recasting of Morpheus might imply that Matrix transmedia (such as The Matrix Online) remains part of the canon.

== Overview ==
In the Matrix films, Morpheus is the captain of the Nebuchadnezzar, a hovercraft of the human forces of the last human city, Zion, in a devastated world where most humans are grown by sentient machines to be used as power sources and their minds kept imprisoned in the Matrix, a virtual computer-generated world, to stop them from realising the truth of the real world. Morpheus was once a human living inside the Matrix until he was freed.

To the Matrix, Morpheus is a terrorist wanted by "Agents", sentient computer programs that patrol and protect the Matrix.

Earlier in his life, Morpheus gained the romantic attention of Niobe, another hovercraft captain. Their relationship became estranged shortly after Morpheus visited the Oracle, an ally living in the Matrix, who told Morpheus that he would be the person who would find the One, a person with superhuman abilities within the Matrix who could end the human/machine war. Since that visit, Morpheus has spent much of his life searching the Matrix for the One.

== Personality ==
In The Matrix and The Matrix Reloaded, Morpheus was a truly inspirational leader and influential teacher to many people, particularly the majority of his crew, to the extent that Tank commented that "Morpheus was a father to them, as well as a leader". In The Matrix Revolutions, with Morpheus's faith in the prophecy shattered, he does not appear as strong a leader or character as he was in the first two films. He comes across as subdued and defeated. Despite his strong faith, Morpheus still showed some rationality in dangerous situations rather than blindly relying on his beliefs to see him through the current crisis; perhaps his only truly irrational decision was to attack Agent Smith while unarmed in order to give Neo a chance to escape.

== Character history ==
=== The Matrix ===
In the first feature film, The Matrix, Morpheus successfully finds and monitors a man named Thomas A. Anderson, a hacker who calls himself Neo. Morpheus offers Neo a choice of ingesting a red pill, which will activate a trace program to locate Neo's body in the real world and allow the Nebuchadnezzar crew to extract him, or a blue pill, which will leave Neo in the Matrix to live and believe as he wishes. Neo takes the red pill. The Nebuchadnezzar crew is then able to eject Neo's body from the Matrix power plant and retrieve him from the cold sewers beneath the Earth's surface. Morpheus takes a risk in helping Neo escape the Matrix, as human minds that live too long in the Matrix may have trouble in comprehending the reality.

Shortly after Neo visits the Oracle, Morpheus is captured by agents who plan to hack into his mind. Because Morpheus, as a hovercraft captain, possesses access codes to the Zion mainframe computer, the surviving members of the ship's crew are about to unplug Morpheus from the Matrix, which would kill him. Neo and Trinity, however, rescue him, and when Neo saves Trinity from a helicopter crash, Morpheus indeed believes that Neo is the One.

=== The Matrix Reloaded ===
In the second film, The Matrix Reloaded, Morpheus is more confident that the war is nearing its end. A spiritual as well as an influential leader, Morpheus convinces one hovercraft ship to stay in the Matrix to await contact from the Oracle, despite orders from Zion for all ships to return to the city. Here he incurs the wrath of Jason Locke, commander of the Zion defensive forces; but Morpheus' actions are defended by Councillor Hamann, a member of the city's ruling body.

With the aid of Trinity and Niobe, Morpheus successfully retrieves the Keymaker, an exiled program that can access many hidden areas of the Matrix, including the Source, the central Machine City mainframe computer and programming heart of the Matrix. Morpheus aids Neo in successfully entering the door to the Source before returning to the Nebuchadnezzar. A sudden Sentinel attack destroys the Nebuchadnezzar, but the crew is rescued by the hovercraft Mjolnir.

=== The Matrix Revolutions ===
In the third film, The Matrix Revolutions, a dispirited Morpheus has problems in understanding now what may happen to Zion and its people. Now without a ship of his own, he and Link (the Nebuchadnezzar's Operator) reside on the hovercraft Mjolnir, commanded by Roland. Morpheus renews his conviction that Neo could still save Zion, and supports Trinity in finding Neo, whose mind is trapped in a computer netherworld called Mobil Avenue, despite not being jacked in. Morpheus is called to the Oracle with Trinity, and with the Oracle's guardian, Seraph, he helps Trinity rescue Neo, via a visit to the Merovingian's lair and a Mexican standoff.

Of the original Nebuchadnezzar crew in the Matrix, Morpheus is the only surviving member to see freedom for Zion.

=== The Matrix Resurrections ===
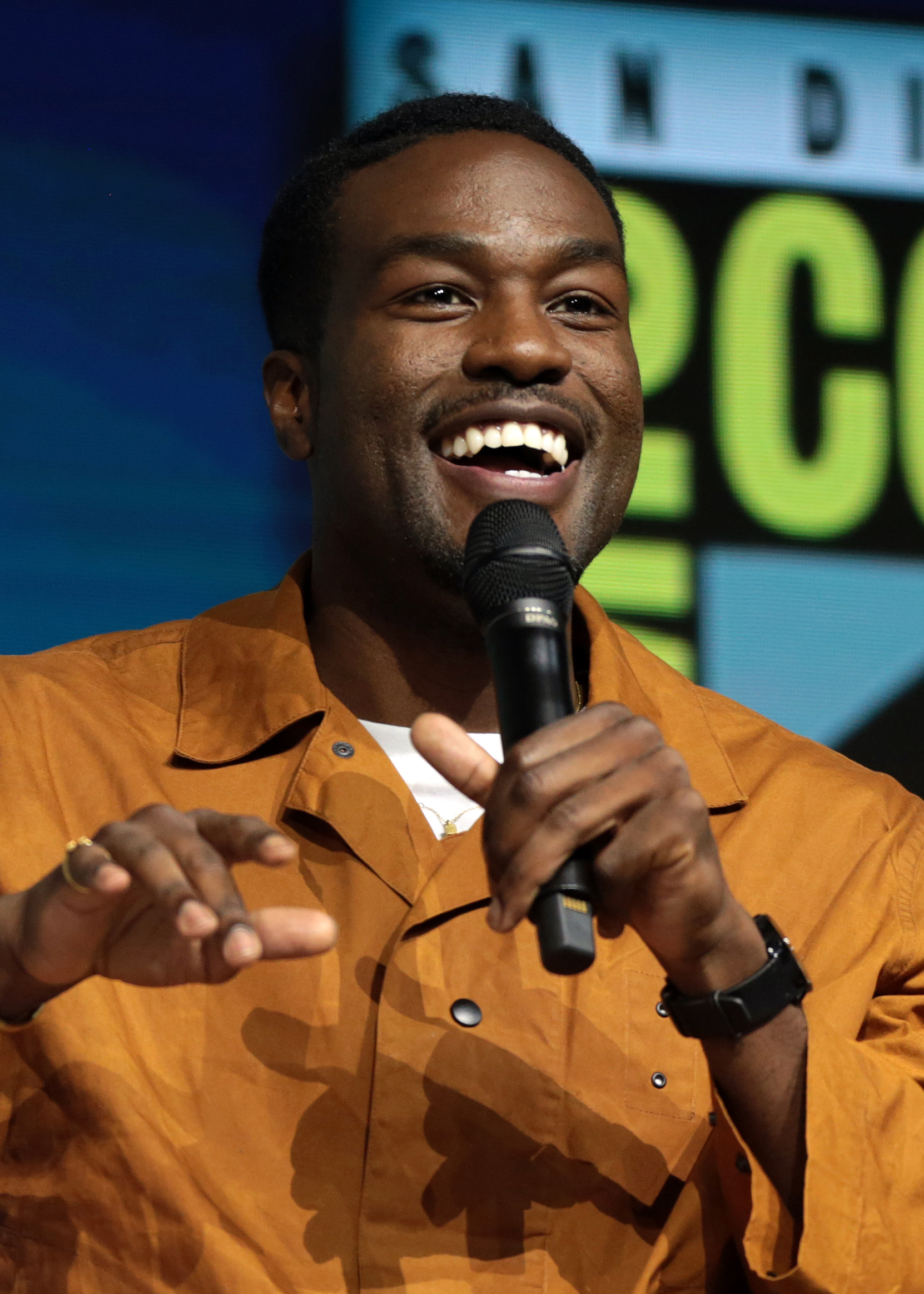
In The Matrix Resurrections, Yahya Abdul-Mateen II portrays an alternate version of Morpheus, replacing Laurence Fishburne in the role.

In the decades between the events of Revolutions and the fourth film The Matrix Resurrections, Morpheus has since died. A new version of him, originally a program subconsciously created by a suppressed Neo as part of a modal based upon his memories, is released by Bugs from the Matrix. Initially, Morpheus is an amalgamation of Neo's memories of Agent Smith and Morpheus. He retains the same purpose as Smith in The Matrix, serving as the lead Agent in a trio alongside Agents White and Jones. After Bugs infiltrates the modal and frees "Smith", he assumes the identity of Morpheus and joins Bugs in working to find and free Neo from the Matrix once again.

== Other appearances ==
- The Matrix Online
- Kia Motors' car commercial for Super Bowl XLVIII.
