= List of Matrix series characters =

This is a list of characters from The Matrix franchise universe. Many of the characters listed here have names reflecting certain aspects of them, such as their status, personality, or role.

== Introduced in The Matrix ==
=== Apoc ===
Apoc (played by Julian Arahanga) is a crew member of the Nebuchadnezzar in The Matrix. He is murdered by Cypher when the latter forcibly unplugs Apoc's connection to the Matrix in the real world, killing him instantly.

=== Choi and DuJour ===
Choi (played by Marc Gray) is assumedly a bluepill who appears in the first movie buying illegal software from Neo, for which Choi pays $2,000 in cash. Choi, his latex-clad girlfriend DuJour (played by Ada Nicodemou), and several unnamed and unspeaking friends arrive at Neo's door after he had been mysteriously told to "follow the white rabbit" through his computer. When Neo notices that Dujour has a tattoo of a white rabbit on the back of her left shoulder, he accepts their offer to go with them to a goth club, where he is approached by Trinity. Going to the club and subsequently waking up late for work the following day set the stage for the rest of the film, though Choi, Dujour, and their friends are never seen or alluded to again.

Much of Choi's dialogue foreshadows the rest of the film: "I know. This never happened. You don't exist", "You need to unplug", and "Hallelujah. You're my savior, man. My own personal Jesus Christ."

These names would appear to be inspired by French language; "Choi" and "DuJour" resembles the French phrase "Choix du jour", meaning "Choice of the day".

=== Cypher/Mr. Reagan ===
Mr. Reagan (a.k.a. Cypher) (played by Joe Pantoliano) is a central character in The Matrix. In the film, he regrets being "unplugged" and entering the real world. He betrays the crew of the Nebuchadnezzar, offering to give up Morpheus to the Agents in exchange for being inserted back into the Matrix with no memory of his time outside the Matrix. In the climax of the film, after the visit to the Oracle, he exits the Matrix and murders members of the crew by leading Mouse into a trap, blasting Dozer and Tank with a lightning rifle, and "unplugging" Switch and Apoc. As he is about to kill Neo and Trinity, a critically injured Tank kills him.

=== Dozer ===
Dozer (played by Anthony Ray Parker) is the pilot and chef of the Nebuchadnezzar. He is Tank's brother, and like him, is unable to enter the Matrix as he was born in Zion and therefore has no mechanical ports that machine-bred humans do. After Cypher attempts to murder Tank, Dozer charges at him and is killed instantly by Cypher's lightning rifle.

=== Mouse ===
Mouse (played by Matt Doran) is a crew member of the Nebuchadnezzar.

In the film, Mouse is the youngest crew member of the Nebuchadnezzar and the programmer of the virtual reality training simulation program. One of his stand-out scenes occurs when he is discussing to Neo whether the Nebuchadnezzar's food tastes like "Tastee Wheat" (a brand of cereal, posters of which can be briefly seen in the train stations shown in The Matrix Revolutions), and adds to the theme of subjective reality by suggesting that the flavor associated with both is not the 'true' flavor, but the Machines' error. He is the creator of the program Woman in the Red Dress, which is used as a distraction in part of Neo's training. He is a very eager young man, excited to see the possibility that Neo could be the one to end the war. He also offers Woman in the Red Dress in a private session to Neo saying, "To deny our impulses is to deny the very thing that makes us human".

Mouse is the first victim of Cypher's betrayal of the crew. As Agent-led SWAT team members storm the building used by Neo and the others as an entry/exit point, Mouse attempts to stop their initial approach wielding dual automatic shotguns (custom made for the film), but is killed by the police.

=== Neo ===
Neo (born Thomas A. Anderson, also known as The One, an anagram for "Neo") is the protagonist of the Matrix franchise. He was portrayed as a cybercriminal and computer programmer by Keanu Reeves in The Matrix Trilogy, as well as having a cameo in The Animatrix short film Kid's Story. Andrew Bowen provided Neo's voice in The Matrix: Path of Neo. In 2008, Neo was selected by Empire as the 68th Greatest Movie Character of All Time. Neo is also an anagram of "one", a reference to his destiny of being The One who would bring peace. There are claims that a nightclub in Chicago inspired the name of the character in the Matrix. Neo is considered to be a superhero.

=== Rhineheart ===
Mr. Rhineheart (played by David Aston) is Thomas Anderson's boss at the software company Metacortex.

=== Switch ===
Switch (played by Belinda McClory) is a member of the crew of the Nebuchadnezzar.

Unlike the mental projections of other crews, who usually wear dark clothes and nearly-opaque sunglasses, Switch wears white clothes and yellow, translucent sunglasses. Switch and Apoc are portrayed as front-line soldiers while inside the Matrix, acting as "point" and "rear guard" in their escape from the Agents and police and providing covering fire as they make their way into the sewers. Switch's weapon of choice is a Browning Hi-Power pistol. Switch also pokes fun at Mouse, calling him "the digital pimp". Switch is killed when her mind is forcibly pulled from the Matrix by Cypher, who betrayed the crew in an attempt to return to the Matrix as a permanent resident himself.

The character was supposedly originally meant to be a feminine character in the Matrix and a man in the real world, but the producers decided to change this because they thought it would confuse the audience.

=== Tank ===
Tank (played by Marcus Chong) is the original Operator of the Nebuchadnezzar.

Tank watches over not only the jacked-in crewmembers, but also the ship itself in case the Sentinels (killing machines) detect the ship. Like all Operators, Tank is a skilled programmer who can provide jacked-in crewmembers almost anything they need and guides them to and from dangerous events within the Matrix.

Tank (and his brother Dozer) is unable to enter the Matrix, as he was born in Zion, and therefore without the mechanical ports which machine-bred humans such as Neo or Morpheus have. After Cypher betrays the crew, Tank becomes his first attempted victim in the real world. Cypher blasts an unaware Tank from behind with a lightning rifle, gravely injuring him. He then takes Tank's place in the Operator's chair after murdering Dozer, taunting Neo and Trinity as he "unplugs" Apoc and Switch. As Cypher is about to unplug Neo, Tank recovers enough from his injuries to stand up and kill Cypher with the lightning rifle. He then rescues Neo and Trinity, providing them weapons and valuable information needed in the film's climax.

Tank dies after the events in The Matrix but before the events in the sequel, The Matrix Reloaded. The character's duties as ship's Operator are handed over to Link, who is married to Tank and Dozer's sister, Zee.

The demise of the character was reportedly due to actor Marcus Chong's salary demands and conflicts with the Wachowskis, the writers and creators of the Matrix series, leading to his removal.

== Introduced in The Matrix Reloaded ==
=== Architect ===
Portrayed by Helmut Bakaitis, he is the "father" of The Matrix and its predecessors, and an exceptionally powerful AI. The Oracle states that he tries to "balance the equations" of the Matrix while she unbalances them. The character first appears in The Matrix Reloaded when Neo encounters him while looking for The Source. The Architect tells Neo that he must choose between saving the Matrix and saving Trinity. After Neo chooses the latter and surrenders himself to the machines to purge Smith from the Matrix, the Architect tells the Oracle at the end of The Matrix Revolutions that he will honor the new human/machine truce and allow everyone who wishes to leave the Matrix to do so. As expected from an AI, the Architect is emotionless, analytical, logical, and pragmatic. He generally views humanity and human emotion with contempt if not outright misanthropy.

Sean Connery was originally offered the role, but turned it down because he did not understand the story.

=== Axel ===
Axel (played by Leigh Whannell) is a crew member of the Vigilant. When the crews of the Vigilant, Nebuchadnezzar, and Logos go to help Neo reach the Source, Axel is the only non-Operator human other than Trinity to not enter the Matrix, owing to a broken leg. Instead, he stands guard, watching for any Sentinel attacks. He hobbles back to Jax soon after to inform him of an imminent attack, but the catwalk below him collapses from the weight of his leg brace, and Axel falls to his death.

=== Ballard ===
Captain Ballard (played by Roy Jones Jr.), is the captain of the Zion hovercraft Caduceus in the film The Matrix Reloaded and the video game Enter the Matrix. He is killed when Bane (possessed by Smith) pre-emptively detonates an EMP, leaving the human crewmembers defenseless against the machines.

=== Bane ===
Bane (played by Ian Bliss) is a crew member of the Zion hovercraft Caduceus in the films The Matrix Reloaded and The Matrix Revolutions. His consciousness is overwritten by Smith in the Matrix, allowing Smith to take control of Bane in the real world. He attempts to assassinate Neo, but is foiled by the Kid. He later attempts to convince Captain Ballard to search for the Nebuchadnezzar, but is rebuffed. The Caduceus is then sent to the front lines to defend against the machines, where Bane pre-emptively detonates the EMP, disabling all hovercraft and enabling the machines to massacre everyone. Bane/Smith is the only survivor and is found unconscious by the Mjolnir. He then kills Maggie and stows aboard the Logos just before Neo and Trinity depart for the machine city. He holds Trinity hostage and fights Neo, blinding the latter by cauterizing Neo's eyes. Despite this, Neo's real-world powers revealed that he could still see auras of all machines, and he kills Bane/Smith in the ensuing battle.

=== Binary ===
Binary (played by Tahei Simpson) is a crew member of the Vigilant. She, Vector, and Soren attack a backup power generator for the local power plant in the Matrix to assist Neo in reaching the Source, but are all immediately killed when the Vigilant is destroyed by Sentinels in the real world. This forces Trinity to enter the Matrix and complete the Vigilant crew's mission.

=== Cas ===
Cas (played by Gina Torres) is the widow of the Nebuchadnezzar's former pilot Dozer.

=== Ghost ===
Ghost (played by Anthony Wong) is the guns specialist of the Logos ship in the video game Enter the Matrix and the feature films The Matrix Reloaded and The Matrix Revolutions.

Ghost is described by the Wachowskis as an "ascetic Buddhist killer". A student of philosophy, he quotes and/or refers to Hume, William James, Nietzsche and especially Kierkegaard. Ghost's name may be a reference to the phrase "ghost in the machine", which describes the concept of mind-body dualism.

Ghost's latest appearance was in the MMORPG The Matrix Online. Due to copyright issues with Anthony Wong, Ghost is bald and has been completely shaven of all facial hair. Ghost, along with "the Twins", are the only recurring characters up-to-date to lack voice actors for The Matrix Online. Ghost was the first to encounter "Trinity" inside the Matrix after her death, although it was not made clear whether this Trinity was 'real' or a simulation.

=== Councillor Hamann ===
Councillor Hamann (played by Anthony Zerbe) is a senior member of the Zion Council. He is supportive of Neo even though, by his own admission, he does not understand the nature of Neo's abilities.

=== Jax ===
Jax (played by Socratis Otto) is the operator of the Vigilant. As Operator, he remained at the console when the crews of the Vigilant, Nebuchadnezzar, and Logos assisted Neo with reaching the Source. Fellow Vigilant crewmate Axel stayed in the real world as well, owing to a broken leg. Axel stood guard, watching for any Sentinel attacks. He hobbles back to Jax soon after to inform him of an imminent attack, but the catwalk below him collapses from the weight of his leg brace, and Axel falls to his death, while a piece of the broken catwalk impales Jax through his chair, killing him. His death prevents him from warning Soren, Vector, and Binary of the imminent Sentinel attack, and all three perish shortly afterwards when the Vigilant is destroyed.

=== Kid ===
Michael Karl Popper (a.k.a. The Kid), played by Clayton Watson, a Zion-dwelling self-substantiated exile, appears in The Matrix Reloaded, The Matrix Revolutions, and The Animatrix short, "Kid's Story". Once a bluepill, he became self-aware and somewhat cognizant of Neo and the Nebuchadnezzar's exploits. He deliberately committed suicide to free himself from the Matrix just before Agents confronted him, idolizing Neo afterwards. He eagerly volunteers to fight in the Battle of Zion, helping to reload APUs, and is the first to inform the civilian population of Zion that the war has ended.

=== Link ===
Link (played by Harold Perrineau) serves as the ship's pilot and operator for the crew of the Zion hovercraft Nebuchadnezzar, replacing Tank and Dozer. He is a man with questionable faith in those around him, as Morpheus is far more daring than any other captain he previously served under, and is not a believer in his wife's superstitions, initially refusing to wear her fortune necklace. However, by the end of The Matrix Revolutions, he appears much more confident in those around him. He wears Zee's fortune necklace (saying "it can't hurt" at first) as he personally detonates the Mjolnir's EMP, saving Zion, and later tells Zee he will never take off the necklace. He also leads Zion's cheer after Neo achieves peace between humans and machines. By the time of The Matrix Resurrections sixty years later, Link is dead, as with everyone else who ever served aboard the same ship as Neo.

=== Lock ===
Commander Jason Lock (played by Harry J. Lennix) is the supreme commander of all military defense forces of the human city Zion. His character appears in The Matrix Reloaded, Enter the Matrix, and The Matrix Revolutions. He was born naturally in Zion and cannot enter the Matrix, nor is he familiar with it. Therefore, he has a practical mind dedicated to defending Zion and keeping its location a secret. Lock is in a relationship with Niobe, who was previously in a relationship with Morpheus. Lock also finds Morpheus's faith in Neo and the prophecy of the One irrational, and is frequently at odds with him and others who also believe in the prophecy. After the Council asks two ships to search for the Nebuchadnezzar, Lock states that he finds it difficult to believe anyone would volunteer for such a daring mission, Niobe volunteers out of spite from being patronized. He continues leading the defense during the battle of Zion, but is enraged when the Mjolnir (piloted by Niobe) miraculously arrives and sets off an EMP, disabling all machines, but also all of Zion's defenses. He then orders Zion to follow the backup plan, a bottlenecked last stand, which is ultimately unnecessary when Neo achieves a truce between the machines and humans.

He is nicknamed "Deadbolt" by both Sparks and Captain Ballard, a reference to his uncompromising and abrasive nature.

=== Maggie ===
Maggie (played by Essie Davis) is the Mjolnir's doctor. She takes care of Bane after the Mjolnir find his unconscious body, unaware that Bane is possessed by Smith. She and Roland become suspicious of Bane/Smith after the latter states he remembers nothing from the ambush. Maggie attempts to administer a sedative at a later time to jog his memory, but is stabbed in the abdomen by Bane/Smith with her own scalpel, dying shortly afterwards.

=== Merovingian ===
The Merovingian (also known as the Frenchman) is a character in The Matrix Reloaded, The Matrix Revolutions and The Matrix Resurrections. He is portrayed by French actor Lambert Wilson in all three films and voiced by Robin Atkin Downes in The Matrix: Path of Neo. He also played a prominent role in The Matrix Online role-playing game. According to the Oracle, he is one of the oldest programs in the Matrix, and he states that he has survived multiple incarnations of the Matrix and confrontations with previous Ones. He and his wife Persephone operate a smuggling ring providing a haven for other exiled programs. He is subtly rude, quite arrogant, and certain that causality is the only real truth of the Matrix (as opposed to choice, which the Oracle believes), despite the fact that previous iterations of the Matrix failed because of a lack of choice given to its bluepill inhabitants. He despises the Oracle, asking Trinity to bring him "the eyes of the Oracle" as payment for freeing Neo from Mobil Avenue. He is also cynical and hedonistic, viewing love as an emotion equal to insanity, frequently committing adultery, and generally being pompous to all those around him. By the time of The Matrix Resurrections, the Merovingian is shown to have lost much of his power, prestige and sanity over the sixty years that have passed since the end of the Machine War.

=== Mifune ===
Captain Mifune (Nathaniel Lees) is the head of Zion's Armored Personnel Unit (APU) corps. He is one of the last APUs standing, but is killed when a massive amount of Sentinels swarm and maim him.

=== Roland ===
Roland (played by David Roberts) is the captain of the hovercraft Mjolnir. He appears in the feature films Reloaded, Revolutions and the video games Enter The Matrix and The Matrix: Path of Neo. He is an older, hard-boiled captain who is initially skeptical of Neo and the One. He later welcomes the crews of the Nebuchadnezzar and Logos aboard on the way to Zion, as the former was destroyed and Niobe gives the latter to Neo and Trinity to reach the machine city. Roland initially flat-out rejects Niobe's plan to fly the Mjolnir (the largest hovercraft in the human fleet) through a cramped maintenance shaft to save time, but eventually relents and mans the guns with everyone else during the journey back to Zion. The Mjolnir arrives in Zion just in time to detonate a critical EMP, and Roland, along with everyone else, is overjoyed when it is revealed Neo has achieved peace between humans and machines.

Roland does not appear in The Matrix Resurrections, but the Mnemosyne's medical officer, Ellster, reveals she is his granddaughter. Ellster also explains to Neo that Roland did not believe in him until Neo's final sacrifice, and in doing so, Neo had freed Roland's mind a second time.

=== Seraph ===
Seraph (portrayed by Collin Chou) is described as the personification of a sophisticated challenge-handshake authentication protocol which guards the Oracle. As a challenge handshake authentication protocol, Seraph is effectively a login screen that fights the user to authenticate their identity. He is also the medium through which the Oracle contacts people in the real world. Neo first discovers Seraph after being summoned to his location by the Oracle. After Seraph confirms Neo's identity by fighting him to a stalemate, he takes Neo through one of the Matrix's many backdoors, leading him to the Oracle. He later accompanies Morpheus and Trinity to Club Hel and successfully convinces the Merovingian and Trainman into releasing Neo from Mobil Avenue. He then guards Sati, but is unable to stop the rapidly multiplying Smiths from assimilating both of them. He is set free after Neo reloads the Matrix. He appears again in The Matrix Online, protecting the Oracle.

Seraph's code appearance is uniquely golden when compared to the rest of the Matrix, which appears as green. The Merovingian and other denizens of Club Hel also note that Seraph is an exiled program formerly employed by the Merovingian, and The Matrix Online hints that he was once a Seraphim, the equivalent to Agents in a previous incarnation of the Matrix. Like other Seraphim, he had wings, which were burnt away when he betrayed the Merovingian. Nevertheless, Seraph remains one of the most powerful entities in the Matrix, being capable of defeating or stalemating all opponents with no apparent injury other than Smith, whom he claims he had defeated before.

The role was initially offered to Michelle Yeoh, but she declined due to a scheduling conflict. The character was changed to a male, with Jet Li being offered a role. As Li declined the role, Chou signed on.

=== Soren ===
Soren (played by Steve Bastoni) is the captain of the Vigilant. He is the first captain to volunteer to help find the Nebuchadnezzar, and is seen conversing with Morpheus when all the captains meet, implying they are either friends, Soren is a believer in the prophecy of the One, or both. He leads Binary and Vector in an attack on a backup power generator for the local power plant in the Matrix to assist Neo in reaching the Source, but is immediately killed alongside them when the Vigilant is destroyed by Sentinels in the real world. This forces Trinity to enter the Matrix and complete the Vigilant crew's mission.

=== The Twins ===
The twins (portrayed by identical twins Neil and Adrian Rayment), are henchmen of the Merovingian. They are believed to be older versions of Agents from a previous iteration of the Matrix, before they became "Exiles", or rogue programs.

=== Vector ===
Vector (played by Don Anjaya Battee) is a crew member of the Vigilant. He, Binary, and Soren attack a backup power generator for the local power plant in the Matrix to assist Neo in reaching the Source, but are all immediately killed when the Vigilant is destroyed by Sentinels in the real world. This forces Trinity to enter the Matrix and complete the Vigilant crew's mission.

=== Zee ===
Zee (played by Nona Gaye) is a native Zionite who experienced the pain of losing her brothers Dozer and Tank (from the original Matrix film), both of whom were killed while serving aboard the Nebuchadnezzar. She is Link's superstitious wife, and worries for him as the Nebuchadnezzar returns to Zion less frequently than other ships. She later joins the resistance and plays a critical role during the final battle at Zion, saving the Kid from a Sentinel, allowing him to shoot the dock gates open for the Mjolnir (with Link inside) to enter Zion and deliver the battle-ending EMP.

The role of Zee was originally given to singer/actress Aaliyah, who was killed in a plane crash on August 25, 2001, before she could complete shooting her part for The Matrix Reloaded. Many singers and actresses were named as potential replacements, including Eva Mendes, Samantha Mumba, Brandy Norwood and Tatyana Ali. Ali actress Nona Gaye was named as Aaliyah's replacement in April 2002. Gaye was nominated for an NAACP Image Award along with co-star Jada Pinkett Smith for the role of Niobe.

== Introduced in The Matrix Revolutions ==
=== Deus Ex Machina ===
Deus Ex Machina (motion-captured by Henry Blasingame, voiced by Kevin Michael Richardson) is the central interface of the Machine City that debuts in the third movie. It consists of a vast swarm of tiny Sentinels that emerge from hatches in a frame plate to form a three-dimensional image of a human face.

=== Sati ===
Sati (portrayed by Tanveer K. Atwal in The Matrix Revolutions and Priyanka Chopra-Jonas in The Matrix Resurrections) is a sentient program, listed for erasure in the Machine World because she serves no purpose within it. Her 'parents', Rama Kandra and Kamala, arrange to have Sati smuggled into the Matrix with the Merovingian in exchange for termination codes for the Oracle. After being brought into the Matrix through Mobil Avenue, a limbo-like space created by the Trainman, and meeting Neo, Sati is delivered into the care of the Oracle, but is overwritten by Smith. She returns to normal after Smith is destroyed and the Matrix is rebooted. Sixty years later, Sati helps to mastermind the rescue of Trinity from the Matrix, revealing that her father had been the one to design the Anomaleum where the resurrected Neo and Trinity were imprisoned.

=== Sparks ===
Sparks (played by Lachy Hulme) is the operator and general-purpose crewmember of the Logos in the film The Matrix Revolutions and the video game Enter the Matrix.

=== Trainman ===
The Trainman (played by Bruce Spence) appears in The Matrix Revolutions. He is an exiled program in the employ of the Merovingian, tasked with smuggling other programs from the machine world to the Matrix when they seek exile. Visually taking the appearance of an unkempt homeless man, he resides at the Mobil Avenue subway station (Mobil being an anagram for Limbo), a separate world from the Matrix which can only be entered or exited via subway trains and where Neo's powers do not extend. Neo wakes up there after falling into a coma as a result of discovering his powers in the real world. He attempts to force the Trainman to allow him to board, but is easily defeated without his powers. Morpheus, Trinity, and Seraph go to free Neo, culminating in a Mexican standoff at the Merovingian's club; the Trainman holds Seraph at gunpoint while being held at gunpoint himself by Trinity before Persephone defuses the situation, convincing the Merovingian to free Neo. The Trainman is not seen again and was possibly assimilated by Smith, who calls Sati "the last Exile" before assimilating her as well.

== Introduced in The Matrix Resurrections ==
=== Bugs ===
Bugs (the name paying homage to Warner Bros. mascot Bugs Bunny; portrayed by Jessica Henwick) is the captain of the hovercraft Mnemosyne. She had long been searching the Matrix for Neo, after being set free from it as a consequence of seeing him attempt to fly. She discovered a node within the Matrix in which Neo's influence recreated a version of the events leading up to his original release from the Matrix. It is during this that she comes into contact with a version of Agent Smith - though this version is based on an amalgamation of two figures central to Neo's original rise: Agent Smith and Morpheus. Bugs frees 'Agent Smith' and he takes on the moniker of Morpheus and joins her crew, and the two continue their search for Neo within the Matrix.

=== The Analyst ===
The Analyst (portrayed by Neil Patrick Harris) is a program responsible for the seventh version of the Matrix. He was present when Neo sacrificed himself to stop Smith at the end of the Machine War. Following the War, the large number of humans being awakened from the Matrix caused an energy crisis and a civil war amongst the Machines. The Analyst, after overthrowing the Architect, suggested a method by which this crisis could be resolved: recover and repair the bodies of Neo and Trinity, then re-insert this powerful duo into the Matrix via a dedicated tower called the Anomaleum. Its program would allow them to remain close to each other and thus generate enough energy to offset that lost from the mass awakenings, while still keeping them far enough apart to prevent them from breaking free of the Matrix and crashing the system.

The Analyst then created the seventh iteration of the Matrix, and took on the guise of Neo's therapist in order to suppress Neo's memories and ensure that he and Trinity remain plugged into the Matrix. He also discovered Smith's continued existence thanks to his link with Neo, and opted to turn that link into a 'chain' by similarly suppressing Smith's memories and forcing him to act as Thomas' business partner. He is defeated by Neo and Trinity with some help from Smith – who wishes to be free, keeping his memories. Neo and Trinity later visit the Analyst, thanking him for giving them a second chance with his actions and warning him against trying to take over the Matrix again.

== Other ==
=== Jue ===
Jue (voiced by Pamela Segall) appears in the Animatrix film "Final Flight of the Osiris".

=== Shimada ===
Shimada, voiced by Kit Harris, is Kid's second-in-command of the organization E Pluribus Neo in the MMORPG game The Matrix Online.

=== Tyndall ===
Tyndall appears only in The Matrix Online, in which she is voiced by Kit Harris.
