= The Oracle (The Matrix) =

- The Matrix character
- Gloria Foster as The Oracle
- First appearance: The Matrix (1999)
- Last appearance: The Matrix Online (2005)
- Created by: The Wachowskis
- Portrayed by: Gloria Foster (The Matrix and The Matrix Reloaded); Mary Alice (The Matrix Revolutions)
- Voiced by: Mary Alice

In-universe information
- Species: Computer program
- Title: A program designed to investigate the human psyche.

The Oracle is a fictional character in The Matrix franchise. She was created by The Wachowskis, and portrayed by Gloria Foster in the first and second film and Mary Alice in the third film. The character also appears in the video game Enter the Matrix and the massively multiplayer online role-playing game The Matrix Online.

== Character history ==
=== Appearances ===
In the first film, the Oracle is depicted as a cheerful old lady who smokes cigarettes and bakes cookies. She possesses the power of foresight, which she uses to advise and guide the humans attempting to fight the Matrix. Later, she is revealed to be a sapient program who is integral to the very nature of the Matrix itself.

Mary Alice as The Oracle

The Oracle is played by Gloria Foster in The Matrix and The Matrix Reloaded, and by Mary Alice in The Matrix Revolutions and Enter the Matrix, one of the franchise's video games. In reality, Mary Alice played the Oracle because Gloria Foster died of complications from diabetes before her role in Matrix Revolutions was shot.

Neo meets with the Oracle three times over the course of the series. In The Matrix, Neo meets the Oracle in an apartment filled with various "potentials" — children whose ability to control their surroundings suggests that they may be The One. During Reloaded, he returns to the apartment only to find it empty, then later finds her waiting for him in a paved courtyard between city buildings. She has with her a purse filled with candies that resemble the red pill Neo took to free himself from the Matrix. In Revolutions, the two meet in the kitchen of the apartment, sometime after Morpheus and Trinity seek her advice in the living room.

=== The Prophecy of the One ===
In The Matrix, Agent Smith reveals that the first Matrix was a failure because it was too perfect for humans to accept (dubbed in The Matrix Online continuity as the Paradise version of the Matrix). The Architect confirms this (and his own responsibility for its creation) in Reloaded, adding that he also created a second failed Matrix based on human history, mythology, and nature (as he perceived it without the Oracle), nicknamed the Nightmare version of the Matrix.

By including the Oracle, whose investigations into the human psyche yielded the answer to creating a functional simulation that humans would accept, a semi-stable system was created with the third version of the Matrix. However, an anomaly within the system still existed. In order to preserve the Matrix's integrity, the prophecy of the One was created to ensure its continuity in cycles.

As the Architect explains in Reloaded, he and the Oracle have very different roles to play in maintaining this cycle, and therefore the Matrix's stability. First, the Oracle spreads a prophecy of The One's final victory over the machines, and those humans who choose to follow this belief are allowed to disconnect from the system voluntarily. They create the real-world settlement of Zion; when its population grows large enough to become a threat to the Matrix's stability, the Architect takes action. He launches a machine offensive campaign to destroy Zion and reunite The One with the Source, rebooting the Matrix and keeping control over the humans. Zion is allowed to be rebuilt, with the One and twenty-three other freed humans (sixteen female and seven male) leading a new generation as the cycle repeats itself. When Neo and the Architect meet, this cycle is about to complete its sixth repetition.

=== The Oracle's Gambit ===
In The Matrix Revolutions, the Oracle hints at her program's true purpose: to correct the anomaly in the Matrix's coding. Whereas the Architect has balanced the equation so the One is created and the cycle repeats endlessly every hundred years, the Oracle unbalances the equation in her attempts to solve the anomaly.

Through dialogue in Reloaded, it is clear the Oracle has concluded that the way to finally solve the anomaly is by ending the war. The Matrix films chronicle her attempt at this.

==== The Matrix ====
As The Matrix begins, The Oracle attempts to unbalance the equation by telling Trinity she will fall in love with the One. Understanding Trinity and Neo's compatibility, she orchestrates their romance. She also gives Neo a cookie when they first meet, which he eats. In Reloaded, the Merovingian reveals he can manipulate the programming of food in the Matrix to change someone's code. It's possible the Oracle does the same to Neo, changing his code so that he becomes the One. By predicting Neo will prove himself to Trinity as they attempt to rescue Morpheus (in a clear rejection of her own prophecy), the Oracle sets the stage for Neo to understand his own role as the One and his confrontation with Smith.

When Trinity confesses her love for Neo, thereby 'confirming' his destiny as the One despite his failure to pass various tests, the Oracle has succeeded in creating a self-fulfilling prophecy. This sets up a new variable to unbalance the Architect's equation: love.

==== Enter the Matrix and The Matrix Reloaded ====
Previous Ones were trained to understand their duty to humanity as a whole, thereby always opting to return to the Source and allow humanity to carry on, despite Zion's destruction. However, Neo is torn between saving humanity and the doomed Trinity, whom he loves. Ultimately, he rejects the Architect's designs and rescues Trinity - a choice no previous Ones needed to make. At the same time, Smith resurfaces following his defeat in The Matrix, and begins assimilating other programs into duplicates of himself - an ability implied to be given to Smith by the Oracle herself, as she created him.

During the events of Enter the Matrix, the Oracle chooses to help programs Kamala and Rama Kandra save their daughter Sati by giving her safe harbor as an Exile in the Matrix, rather than let her return to the Source where programs are destroyed. The Merovingian allows Sati safe passage into the Matrix via the Trainman, though it comes at the cost of the Oracle's termination code, forcing her to inhabit a new form.

==== The Matrix Revolutions ====
Neo's choice to save Trinity at Reloaded's climax sets the rest of the Oracle's plan into action. Understanding that as the One, Neo will still inevitably be drawn to the Source by visions, she orchestrates a situation wherein this will lead to a truce, rather than resetting the cycle once more. Speaking to Neo about Smith's nature, she subtly guides him to the fact that he must follow his visions to the Machine City. Telling him that 'every beginning has an end,' she says farewell to him, predicting accurately that they will not meet again.

Smith then assimilates the Oracle and attains what he believes to be her powers of precognition - but in reality are simply her abilities to understand human behavior. He continues on to assimilate the entire Matrix, posing an existential threat to both human and machine survival.

Outside the Matrix, Neo and Trinity ultimately go to the Machine City. Although Trinity dies during the journey, Neo treaties with the machines in order to stop the rogue program Smith, who poses an existential threat to both the human and machine worlds. When Neo faces down Smith, it is the Oracle's assimilated frame he battles. At the climax of their fight, Smith fully realizes the Oracle's predictive nature, saying aloud to Neo that 'everything that has a beginning has an end' and realizing his defeat is inevitable. Still, he attempts to kill Neo once and for all.

By surrendering his concept of 'victory' and allowing Smith to assimilate him, Neo links Smith directly to the Source, allowing the machines to destroy the program-turned-virus. The machines end their siege on Zion and the ones Smith assimilated return to their original states.

The Oracle therefore succeeds in unbalancing the Matrix to the extent that both the humans and machines are almost destroyed. In doing so, she manages to bring about a resolution wherein the machines and the humans can coexist in peace. She does this by gambling on a concept both the Architect and Smith scoff at, yet multiple programs also seem capable of understanding: human love.

At the conclusion of The Matrix Revolutions, the Architect meets with the Oracle. He tells her she "played a very dangerous game" orchestrating this entire situation, to which she replies that "change always is [dangerous]". The Architect also promises to the Oracle that humans desiring to leave the Matrix will be freed as part of the peacemaking between the humans and the machines. Sati and the Oracle admire a sunset the former made for Neo. When asked whether Neo will return, the Oracle says she suspects that they will see him again. Seraph, another program who functions as the Oracle's guardian, asks if she knew Neo would succeed. The Oracle replies that she didn't know, but that she believed.

=== Aftermath ===
In between the events of The Matrix Revolutions and The Matrix Resurrections, the Oracle is one of many programs who is purged by the Machines before the new Matrix is uploaded. Niobe later tells a resurrected Neo that the last message that they received from her was that a new power was rising. Despite this, the Oracle still appears in The Matrix Resurrections in the form of flashbacks.

== Character analysis ==
Whether the Oracle's power of prediction is deterministic or not is a concept given much treatment in the three films in which she appears. She claims to lack the ability to see past her own choice, explaining that no one, including herself, can see past a choice they do not understand. It becomes clear in the films that her power cannot be used to predict the ultimate consequences of Neo, who possesses free will when he alters her prophecy regarding Morpheus's death and when he defies the Architect.

Her powers of foresight, on the other hand, are likely not based on knowledge of a predetermined future, but rather a calculation; The Architect revealed the Oracle to be "a program designed to investigate the human psyche"; thus, allowing the Matrix to become more accustomed for the majority of the human population to accept. She exhibits a trait for predicting events directly relevant to the nature and/or programming of the Matrix, and natural human responses according to her knowledge of them.

The Yin-Yang relationship between the Architect and the Oracle is a form of balance between opposing forces, so it becomes clear that they are the two balancing forces of the Matrix itself: the fallible human factor and the machines' cold logic. This idea is hinted at in the films as the Oracle is wearing yin-yang earrings throughout Revolutions. This process of balance between opposing forces is further realized in dialogue between the Oracle and Neo in Revolutions ("He is your opposite.") Their final rain-soaked conflict in Revolutions suggests a collision between matter and anti-matter.

The Oracle is discussed by sociologist Matthew Hughey as an example of the Magical Negro stock character. He writes that the Matrix is mostly presented as a "clean and bright" city full of white people, but when Neo is brought to the Oracle, who sets him on his path to becoming a hero, she is shown to be chain-smoking and baking cookies—which marks her as a stereotypical "welfare queen". According to Tani Dianca Sanchez, the personification of the Oracle by a black woman, who is robbed of her essence and existence by Agent Smith yet ultimately survives his destruction, is a rare reference in mainstream media to womanist theories of black women as liberators and saviors through their own suffering. Sanchez writes that while the Oracle embodies aspects of the black mammy stereotype in caring for white children, she ultimately represents "a radical transformation of Western denigration of black women" by acting as an othermother and teacher who challenges Western ideals of feminine beauty and wisdom; by suggesting a connection between the ancient Greek oracles and black cultures, the character also undermines traditional assumptions that white, Western culture developed independently of other cultures and races. Nicola Rehling writes that in opposition to the Architect's espousal of fate and inevitability, the Oracle introduces choice into the Matrix and "complicates the association of cyberspace with normative white masculinity" through her nature as a sentient computer program.

== See also ==
- Oracle
- Precognition
- Prediction
- Prophecy
- Simulated reality
