= The Matrix Reloaded =

2003 film by the Wachowskis

- Theatrical release poster
- Directed by: The Wachowskis (Note: Credited as The Wachowski Brothers.)
- Written by: The Wachowskis
- Based on: Characters by The Wachowskis
- Produced by: Joel Silver
- Starring: Keanu Reeves; Laurence Fishburne; Carrie-Anne Moss; Hugo Weaving; Jada Pinkett Smith; Gloria Foster
- Cinematography: Bill Pope
- Edited by: Zach Staenberg
- Music by: Don Davis
- Production companies: Warner Bros. Pictures; Village Roadshow Pictures; NPV Entertainment; Silver Pictures
- Distributed by: Warner Bros. Pictures
- Release dates: May 7, 2003 (Mann Village Theatre); May 15, 2003 (United States)
- Running time: 138 minutes
- Country: United States
- Language: English
- Budget: $127–150 million
- Box office: $741.8 million

The Matrix Reloaded is a 2003 American science fiction action film written and directed by the Wachowskis. It is the second installment in the Matrix film series and the sequel to The Matrix (1999). The film stars Keanu Reeves, Laurence Fishburne, Carrie-Anne Moss, Hugo Weaving, and Gloria Foster, who reprise their roles from the previous film, with Jada Pinkett Smith joining the cast. In the film, Neo, Morpheus, and Trinity attempt to reach the Source of the Matrix to end the war as Zion prepares for an invasion from the machines.

The film premiered on May 7, 2003, in Westwood, Los Angeles, California, and had its worldwide release by Warner Bros. Pictures on May 15, 2003, including a screening out of competition at the 2003 Cannes Film Festival. The video game Enter the Matrix and The Animatrix, a collection of short animations, supported and expanded the film's story.

The film received generally positive reviews, though most critics found it inferior to the first film. It grossed $741.8 million worldwide, breaking Terminator 2: Judgment Day's record for becoming the highest-grossing R-rated film of all time, until Deadpool surpassed it in 2016. In addition to being the highest-grossing film in the franchise, it was the third-highest-grossing film of 2003, behind The Lord of the Rings: The Return of the King and Finding Nemo. A direct sequel titled The Matrix Revolutions was released six months later on November 5, 2003.

== Plot ==
Six months after escaping the Matrix, (Note: As depicted in The Matrix (1999)) Neo and Trinity are now romantically involved. Morpheus receives a message from Captain Niobe of the Logos calling an emergency meeting of all ships of Zion. An army of Sentinels is tunneling towards Zion and will reach it within 72 hours. Commander Lock orders all ships to return to Zion to prepare, but Morpheus asks one ship to remain to contact the Oracle. But within the Matrix, Bane, a member of the crew, encounters the former Agent Smith. Smith forcibly overwrites his mind, effectively killing him and possessing his body. Thus able to enter the real world, he exits the Matrix.

In Zion, Morpheus announces the news of the advancing machines. The Nebuchadnezzar leaves Zion and enters the Matrix, where Neo meets the Oracle's bodyguard Seraph, who leads him to her. The Oracle reveals that she is part of the Matrix and instructs Neo to reach its Source with the help of the Keymaker. As the Oracle departs, Smith appears, telling Neo that he became a rogue program after being defeated by him. He demonstrates his ability to clone himself over other inhabitants of the Matrix, including the new upgraded Agents. He tries to take over Neo's body but fails, prompting a battle between Neo and many copies of Smith. Neo defends himself, but is forced to retreat.

Neo, Morpheus, and Trinity visit the Merovingian, who is imprisoning the Keymaker. The Merovingian, a rogue program with his own agenda, refuses to let him go. His wife Persephone, seeking revenge on her husband for his infidelity, leads the trio to the Keymaker. Morpheus, Trinity, and the Keymaker flee while Neo holds off the Merovingian's henchmen. Morpheus and Trinity try to escape with the Keymaker, pursued by several Agents and the Merovingian's chief henchmen, the Twins. After a long chase, Trinity escapes, Morpheus defeats the Twins, and Neo saves Morpheus and the Keymaker from Agent Johnson.

The crews of the Nebuchadnezzar, Vigilant, and Logos help the Keymaker and Neo reach the Source. The Logos crew must destroy a power plant and the Vigilant crew must disable a back-up power station to bypass a security system, allowing Neo to enter the Source. Haunted by a vision of Trinity's death, he asks her to remain on the Nebuchadnezzar. The Logos is successful, but the Vigilant is destroyed by a Sentinel. Trinity replaces the Vigilant crew and completes their mission. Agent Thompson corners her and they fight. Neo, Morpheus, and the Keymaker try to reach the Source via a hallway of Matrix backdoors, however the Smiths ambush them. The Keymaker is killed after unlocking the door to the Source for Neo.

Neo meets a program called the Architect, an artificial intelligence computer programme who created the Matrix, who explains that, as the One, Neo is an intentional part of the design of the Matrix, now in its sixth iteration. Neo is meant to stop the Matrix's fatal system crash that naturally recurs due to humans' free will, leading to dozens of humans gradually refusing to accept the simulation. As with the five previous Ones, Neo has a choice: either reboot the Matrix from the Source and pick a handful of survivors to repopulate the soon-to-be-destroyed Zion, as his predecessors all did, or go to save the imperiled Trinity, causing the Matrix to crash and killing everyone in it. Neo chooses the latter, prompting a dismissive response from the Architect.

Neo's vision of Trinity comes true as she is shot by Agent Thompson while falling off a building. Before she hits the ground, Neo arrives and catches her. He then removes the bullet from her chest and restarts her heart. They return to the real world, where Sentinels attack them. The Nebuchadnezzar is destroyed, but the crew escapes. As the Sentinels catch up to them, Neo realizes he can sense the machines in the real world, and telepathically destroys them but falls into a coma. The crew are picked up by another ship, the Hammer. The Hammer's captain reveals that the machines wiped other ships defending Zion after someone prematurely activated an EMP. Only one survivor was found: the Smith-possessed Bane, who lies beside Neo in the medical bay, also unconscious.

== Cast ==
- Keanu Reeves as Neo
- Laurence Fishburne as Morpheus
- Carrie-Anne Moss as Trinity
- Hugo Weaving as Smith
- Jada Pinkett Smith as Niobe
- Harold Perrineau as Link
- Gloria Foster as the Oracle
- Randall Duk Kim as the Keymaker
- Monica Bellucci as Persephone
- Lambert Wilson as the Merovingian
- Helmut Bakaitis as the Architect
- Nathaniel Lees as Captain Mifune
- Neil and Adrian Rayment as the Twins
- Daniel Bernhardt as Agent Johnson
- Leigh Whannell as Axel
- Collin Chou as Seraph
- Nona Gaye as Zee
- Gina Torres as Cas
- Donald Anjaya Batte as Vector
- Anthony Zerbe as Councillor Hamann
- Roy Jones Jr. as Captain Ballard
- David A. Kilde as Agent Jackson
- Matt McColm as Agent Thompson
- Harry Lennix as Commander Lock
- Cornel West as Councillor West
- Steve Bastoni as Captain Soren
- Anthony Wong as Ghost
- Ian Bliss as Bane
- Clayton Watson as the Kid
- Malcolm Kennard as Abel
- Genevieve O'Reilly as Officer Wirtz
- Tory Mussett as Beautiful Woman at Le Vrai
- Essie Davis as Maggie

Zee was originally played by Aaliyah, who died in a plane crash on August 25, 2001, before filming was complete, requiring her scenes to be reshot with Nona Gaye. Pinkett Smith declined to play her role in Nutty Professor II: The Klumps in order to star in The Matrix Reloaded. Jet Li was offered the role of Seraph, but turned it down as he did not want his martial arts moves digitally recorded. Michelle Yeoh was then considered to replace Li's portrayal, but she turned down the role as well due to production of The Touch.

== Production ==
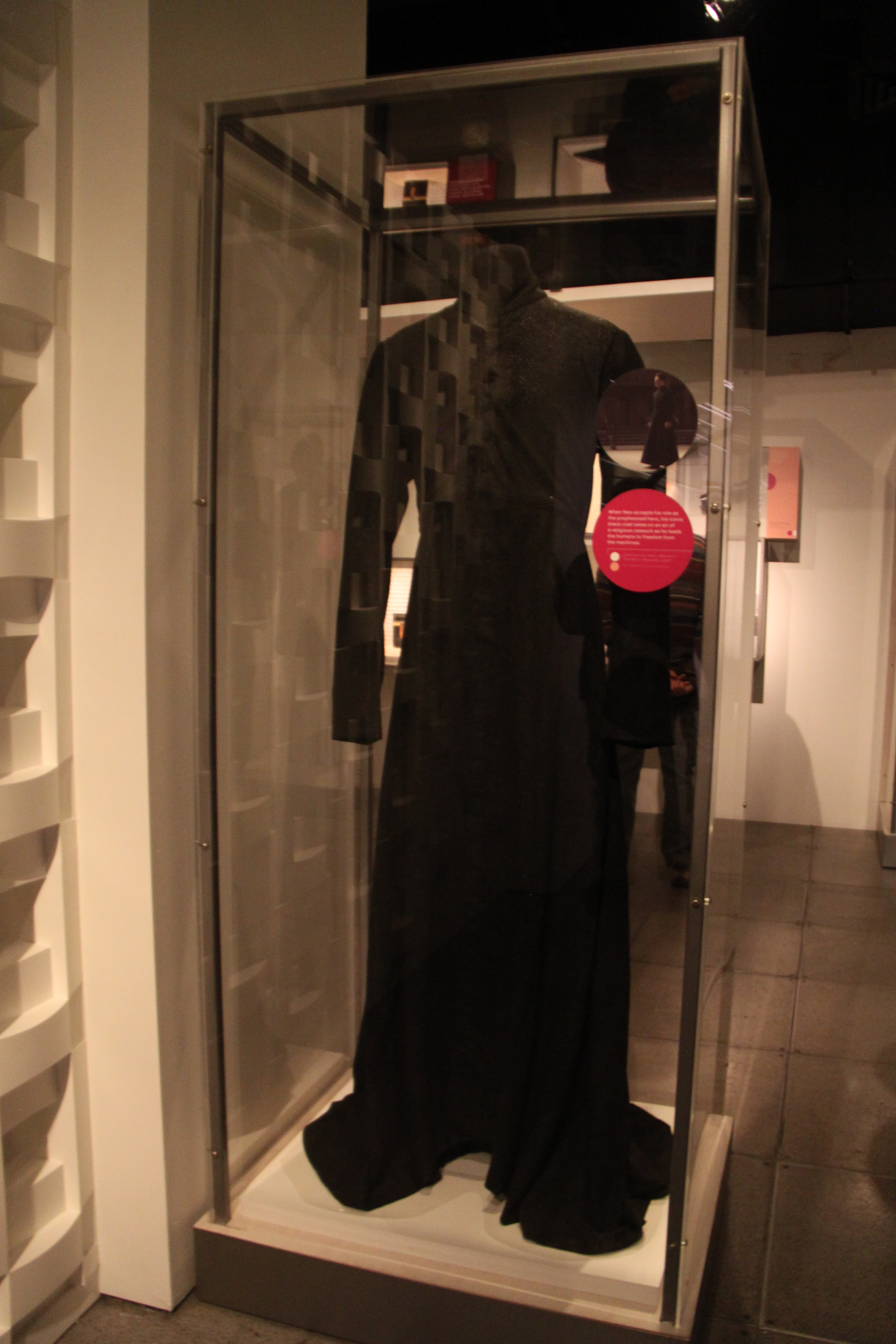
The coat that Neo wears in The Matrix

=== Filming ===
The Matrix Reloaded was mostly filmed at Fox Studios in Australia. Filming began on March 1, 2001, and ended on August 21, 2002, concurrently with the filming of the second sequel, Revolutions and the live-action footage for the Enter the Matrix video game. The freeway chase and "Burly Brawl" scenes were filmed at the decommissioned Naval Air Station Alameda in Alameda, California. The producers constructed a 1.5-mile freeway on the old runways specifically for the film. Some portions of the chase were also filmed in Oakland, California, and the tunnel shown briefly is the Webster Tube, which connects Oakland and Alameda. Some post-production editing was also done in old aircraft hangars on the base. The city of Akron, Ohio was willing to give full access to Route 59, the stretch of freeway known as the "Innerbelt", for filming of the freeway chase when it was under consideration. However, producers decided against this as "the time to reset all the cars in their start position would take too long". General Motors was hired to donate over 300 cars to be used during production, destroying them for the sake of creating art. MythBusters would later reuse the Alameda location in order to explore the effects of a head-on collision between two semi trucks, and to perform various other experiments. It took 27 days to film the Burly Brawl sequence, which was combined with motion capture and CGI. This would become one of the most expensive action scenes, costing $40 million to make. Around 97% of the materials from the sets of the film were recycled after production was completed; for example, tons of wood were sent to Mexico to build low-income housing.

=== Visual effects ===
Following the success of the previous film, the Wachowskis came up with extremely difficult action sequences, such as the Burly Brawl, a scene in which Neo had to fight 100 Agent Smiths. To develop technologies for the film, Warner Bros. launched ESC Entertainment. The ESC team tried to figure out how to bring the Wachowskis' vision to the screen, but because bullet time required arrays of carefully aligned cameras and months of planning, even for a brief scene featuring two or three actors, a scene like the Burly Brawl seemed almost impossible as envisioned and could take years to composite. Eventually, John Gaeta realized that the technology he and his crew had developed for The Matrix's bullet time was no longer sufficient and concluded they needed a virtual camera (in other words, a simulation of a camera). Having before used real photographs of buildings as texture for 3D models in The Matrix, the team started digitizing all data, such as scenes, characters' motions, or even the reflectivity of Neo's cassock.

The reflectivity of objects needed to be captured and simulated adequately. Paul Debevec et al. had developed techniques for capturing the reflectance of the human face, and George Borshukov, visual effects lead at ESC, based his work strongly on their findings. Borshukov and the ESC team developed “Universal Capture,” a process that samples and stores facial details and expressions at high resolution. They captured expressions from Reeves and Weaving using a dense capture, multi-camera setup (similar to the bullet time rig) that combined photogrammetry and a technique called optical flow. The algorithm for Universal Capture was written by Borshukov, who had also created the photo-realistic buildings for the visual effects in The Matrix. With this collected wealth of data and the right algorithms, they finally were able to create virtual cinematography in which characters, locations, and events could all be created digitally and viewed through virtual cameras, eliminating the restrictions of real cameras, years of compositing data, and replacing the use of still camera arrays or, in some scenes, cameras altogether. The ESC team rendered the final effects using the program Mental Ray.

=== Music ===
Don Davis, who composed for The Matrix, returned to score Reloaded. For many of the pivotal action sequences, such as the "Burly Brawl", he collaborated with Juno Reactor. Some of the collaborative cues by Davis and Juno Reactor are extensions of material by Juno Reactor; for example, a version of "Komit" featuring Davis' strings is used during a flying sequence, and "Burly Brawl" is essentially a combination of Davis' unused "Multiple Replication" and a piece similar to Juno Reactor's "Masters of the Universe". One of the collaborations, "Mona Lisa Overdrive", is titled in reference to the cyberpunk novel of the same name by William Gibson, a major influence on the directors.

Leitmotifs established in The Matrix return—such as the Matrix main theme, Neo and Trinity's love theme, the Sentinel's theme, Neo's flying theme, and a more frequent use of the four-note Agent Smith theme—and others used in Revolutions are established.

As with its predecessor, many tracks by external musicians are featured in the movie, its closing credits, and the soundtrack album, some of which were written for the film. Many of the musicians featured, for example Rob Zombie, Rage Against the Machine and Marilyn Manson, had also appeared on the soundtrack for The Matrix. Rob Dougan also re-contributed, licensing the instrumental version of "Furious Angels", as well as being commissioned to provide an original track, ultimately scoring the battle in the Merovingian's chateau. A remixed version of "Slap It" by electronic band Fluke—listed on the soundtrack as "Zion"—was used during the rave scene.

Linkin Park contributed their instrumental piece "Session" to the film as well, although it did not appear during the course of the main portion of the film. P.O.D. composed a song called "Sleeping Awake", with a music video which focused heavily on Neo, as well as many images that were part of the film. Both songs played during the film's credits.

It was originally planned for the electronic band Röyksopp to create the soundtrack, but this offer was turned down.

== Release ==
=== Home media ===
The Matrix Reloaded was released on VHS and DVD on October 14, 2003. On the first day release, the DVD release sold over 4 million units. A Blu-ray release followed on September 7, 2010. The Matrix Reloaded was released as a part of The Matrix Trilogy on 4K UHD Blu-ray on October 30, 2018.

== Reception ==
=== Box office ===
The Matrix Reloaded earned an estimated $5 million during Wednesday night previews in the United States and Canada. It grossed $37.5 million on its Thursday opening day from 3,603 theaters, which was the second-highest opening day after Spider-Man's $39.4 million. The film earned $91.7 million during its opening weekend and $134.3 million in its first four days, including the previews. This made it not only the second-highest opening weekend of all time, but also the biggest opening weekend for any Warner Bros. film, beating Harry Potter and the Sorcerer's Stone. For six years, the film would hold the record for having the largest number of screenings for an R-rated film until the opening of Watchmen in March 2009. The Matrix Reloaded also surpassed Star Wars: Episode II – Attack of the Clones to have the highest Thursday opening. It would hold this record for two years until it was taken by Star Wars: Episode III – Revenge of the Sith in 2005. Additionally, the film had the highest opening weekend for an R-rated film, breaking the previous record held by Hannibal. With a total gross of $146.9 million, The Matrix Reloaded held the record for having the biggest six-day opening until 2004, when it was surpassed by Spider-Man 2.

In its second weekend, it would be overtaken by Bruce Almighty, earning a 4-day Memorial Day weekend gross of $45.6 million. Then, The Matrix Reloaded collected $15.6 million for its third weekend, ranking fourth behind the latter film, Finding Nemo and The Italian Job. The opening weekend represented roughly 60% of that weekend's box-office tally, but some box-office prognosticators noted it fell short of lofty expectations set by some in the industry. Overall, the film would maintain the highest May opening weekend for Warner Bros. until it was beaten by Godzilla a decade later in 2014. The Matrix Reloaded and Finding Nemo both teamed up with Bruce Almighty, X2 and Pirates of the Caribbean: The Curse of the Black Pearl to become the first five films to make $200 million at the box office in a single summer season. This was also the fourth R-rated film to cross that mark, just after Beverly Hills Cop, Terminator 2: Judgment Day and Saving Private Ryan. It would remain as the year's top-grossing film until Finding Nemo overtook it in July.

Internationally, The Matrix Reloaded opened in 13 territories, including Australia and France, and grossed $37.5 million in its first week. It expanded to most international territories (62) the following weekend, except Japan and India, and became the first movie to earn more than $100 million outside the U.S. in one weekend, taking its overseas total to $176 million and worldwide total to $385 million. Grossing over $113.2 million, the film scored the highest international opening weekend, breaking the previous record held by The Lord of the Rings: The Two Towers. In Japan, it had the biggest opening of any film in the country, earning $18 million and smashing the previous record held by Harry Potter and the Chamber of Secrets. It was also the country's highest-grossing R-rated film until The Last Samurai surpassed it in early 2004. There were other opening records in Russia and South Korea. The Japan and South Korea opening records were both given to Spider-Man 3 in 2007. In the United Kingdom, the film topped the box office for four weeks until it was overtaken by 2 Fast 2 Furious.

The film ultimately grossed $281.6 million in the US, and $739.4 million worldwide, becoming the third-highest-grossing film of 2003, after Finding Nemo and The Lord of the Rings: The Return of the King. It would have the highest domestic gross for an R-rated film until it was taken by The Passion of the Christ the next year. For over a decade, The Matrix Reloaded held the record for being the highest-grossing R-rated film worldwide before Deadpool took it 13 years later. The film sold an estimated 46,695,900 tickets in North America. Following re-releases, the worldwide gross of the film is $741.8 million.

=== Critical response ===
On Rotten Tomatoes, the film holds an approval rating of 74% based on 246 reviews, and an average score of 6.80/10. The site's critical consensus states: "Though its heady themes are a departure from its predecessor, The Matrix Reloaded is a worthy sequel packed with popcorn-friendly thrills." On Metacritic, the film has a weighted average score 62 out of 100 based on 40 reviews, indicating "generally favorable reviews". Audiences polled by CinemaScore gave the film an average grade of "B+" on an A+ to F scale, down from the "A−" earned by the previous film.

Positive comments from critics included commendation for the quality and intensity of its action sequences, and its intelligence. Tony Toscano of Talking Pictures had high praise for the film, saying that "its character development and writing...is so crisp it crackles on the screen" and that "Matrix Reloaded re-establishes the genre and even raises the bar a notch or two" above the first film, The Matrix. Roger Ebert of the Chicago Sun-Times also commended the film, giving it three and a half stars out of four. He described it as "an immensely skillful sci-fi adventure, combining the usual elements: heroes and villains, special effects and stunts, chases and explosions, romance and oratory" and praised the fact that "it develops its world with more detail than the first movie was able to afford, gives us our first glimpse of the underground human city of Zion, burrows closer to the heart of the secret of the Matrix, and promotes its hero, Neo, from confused draftee to a Christ figure in training." He also compared the choreography of the "Burly Brawl" fight to that of Yuen Woo-ping in the 2000 film Crouching Tiger, Hidden Dragon, and called the scene "one of the three great set pieces in the movie" (along with Morpheus' announcement to the people of Zion and the freeway chase).

Negative comments included the sentiment that the plot was alienating, with some critics regarding the focus on the action as a detriment to the film's human elements. Some critics thought that the number of scenes with expository dialogue worked against the film, and the many unresolved subplots, as well as the cliffhanger ending, were also criticized. Other criticisms included the film's perceived lack of pacing. Entertainment Weekly named it as one of "The 25 Worst Sequels Ever Made".

Marc Salov of The Austin Chronicle gave it a two-and-a-half out of five rating, saying, "There's only so much Rubik's Cubism a film can handle, and Reloaded is awash in sci-fi and religious overtones that continually bog down the film's forward motion." Mike Clark of USA Today gave the film three out of four stars and said, "Salvaged by its rally, Reloaded seems less tired than X2, its current sequel rival." A. O. Scott of The New York Times wrote, "Relax, the staging of the action sequences is as viciously elegant as you've been primed to expect, though there is a dispiriting more-of-the-same aspect to the picture." In a mixed review, Joe Morgenstern of The Wall Street Journal said, "In this second installment of the trilogy, lithe bodies endowed with superior brains do all sorts of spectacular things, but the movie has the dead soul of a video game." Glenn Kenny of Premiere explained that "the intellectual aspirations of this series are just window dressing, which left this viewer to enjoy the freeway chase sequence (which really is cool), Hugo Weaving's smirk, and even the PlayStationish stuff".

=== Censorship ===
The film was initially banned in Egypt because of the violent content and because it put into question issues about human creation, "which are related to the three divine religions."

== See also ==
- Simulated reality
- List of films featuring powered exoskeletons
