= Red pill and blue pill =

Metaphor for a choice of truth or illusion

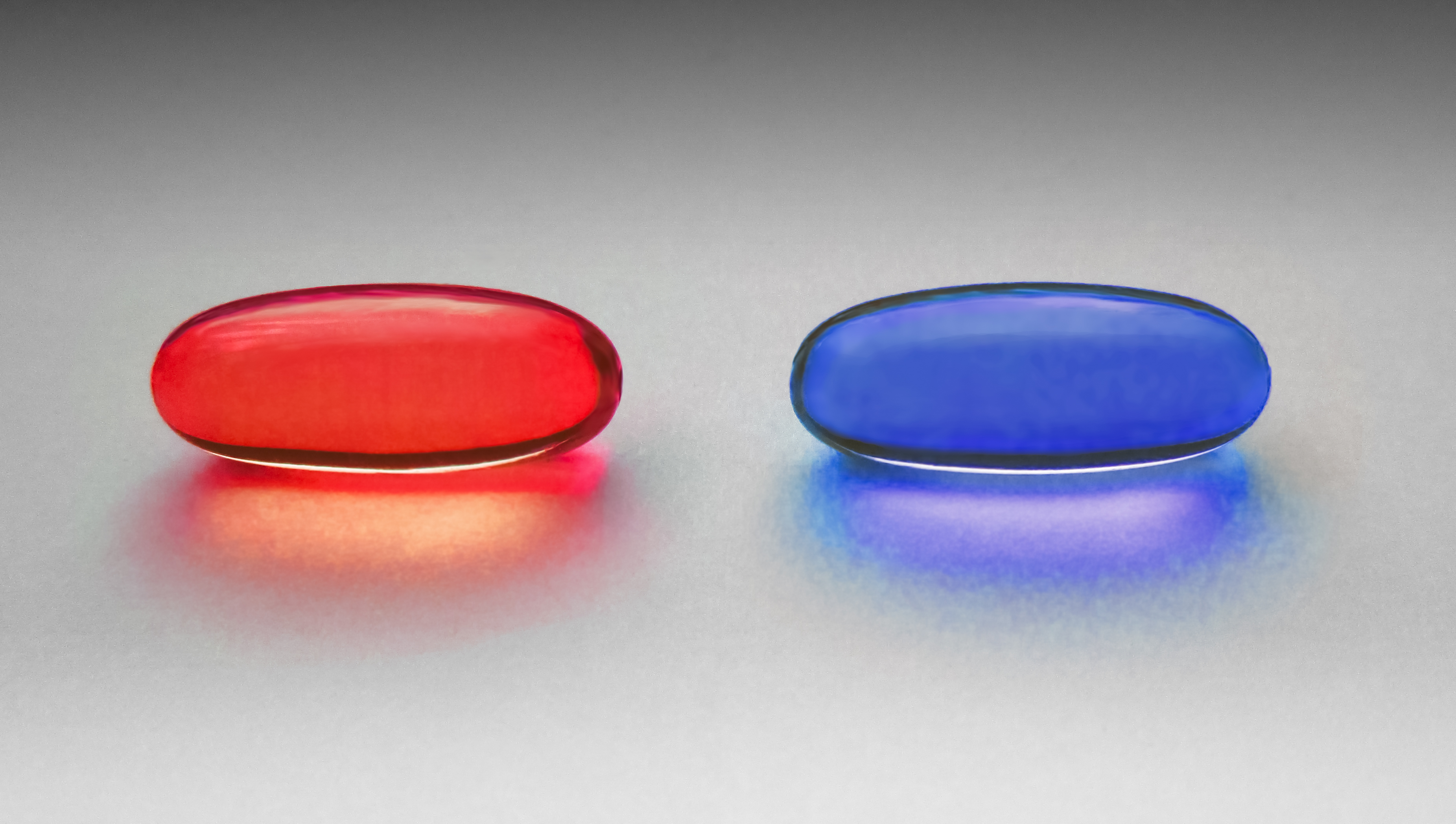
Red (revelation) and blue (illusion) capsule pills

Red pill and blue pill are metaphorical terms representing a choice between learning an unsettling or life-changing truth by taking the red pill or remaining in the unquestioned and persistent illusion appearing as ordinary reality with the blue pill. The pills were used as props in the 1999 film The Matrix.

== Antecedents ==
Scene from Total Recall (1990) where Dr. Edgemar (Roy Brocksmith) asks Quaid (Arnold Schwarzenegger) to swallow a red pill, which he claims will return him to reality

The trope of a "red pill" as a symbol of a return to reality made its first appearance in the 1990 film Total Recall, in which the protagonist (played by Arnold Schwarzenegger) is asked to swallow a red pill, which he is told will awaken him from a dreamlike state he is currently experiencing. However, this is presented as a deception and the pill's actual effect remains ambiguous.

== In The Matrix ==
Scene from The Matrix (1999) where Morpheus (Laurence Fishburne) offers the protagonist a red and blue pill

In the 1999 film The Matrix, the main character Neo (played by Keanu Reeves) is offered the choice between a red pill and a blue pill by rebel leader Morpheus (played by Laurence Fishburne). Morpheus says "You take the blue pill... the story ends, you wake up in your bed and believe whatever you want to believe. You take the red pill... you stay in Wonderland, and I show you how deep the rabbit hole goes." It is implied that the blue pill is a sedative that would cause Neo to think that all his most recent experiences were a hallucination, so that he can go back to living in the Matrix's simulated reality. The red pill, on the other hand, serves as a "location device" to locate the subject's body in the real world and to prepare them to be "unplugged" from the Matrix.

=== Later Matrix films ===
In a 2012 interview, Matrix director Lana Wachowski said:

What we were trying to achieve with the story overall was a shift, the same kind of shift that happens for Neo, that Neo goes from being in this sort of cocooned and programmed world, to having to participate in the construction of meaning to his life. And we're like, "Well, can the audience go through the three movies and experience something similar to what the main character experiences?" So the first movie is sort of classical in its approach. The second movie is deconstructionist, and it assaults all of the things that you thought to be true in the first movie, and so people get very upset, and they're like "Stop attacking me!" in the same way that people get upset with deconstructionist philosophy. I mean, Derrida and Foucault, these people upset us. And then the third movie is the most ambiguous because it asks you to actually participate in the construction of meaning...

— Lana Wachowski, Movie City News, October 13, 2012

In the 2021 film The Matrix Resurrections, the Analyst uses blue pills to keep Neo's true memories suppressed in the guise of therapy sessions. Later, Neo takes another red pill before being freed from the Matrix once again by Bugs and her crew. In Trinity's case, she does not have to take the red pill again because of the way that Sati is freeing her from the Matrix. The red pills also allow friendly programs to leave the Matrix, as seen with the program version of Morpheus.

== Analysis ==
Philosopher and critic Russell Blackford questions whether a fully informed person would take the red pill and stay in the real world, arguing that the choice of physical reality over a digital simulation is not so beneficial as to be valid for all people. Both Neo and another character, Cypher (Joe Pantoliano), take the red pill over the blue pill, though later in the first Matrix film, Cypher demonstrates regret for having made that choice, saying that if Morpheus had fully informed him of the situation, Cypher would have told him to "shove the red pill right up [his] ass." When Cypher subsequently makes a deal with the machines to return to the Matrix and forget everything he had learned, he says, "Ignorance is bliss." Blackford argues that the Matrix films set things up so that even if Neo fails, the taking of the red pill is worthwhile because he lives and dies authentically. Blackford and science-fiction writer James Patrick Kelly feel that The Matrix stacks the deck against machines and their simulated world.

Matrix Warrior: Being the One author Jake Horsley compared the red pill to LSD, citing a scene where Neo forms his own world outside of the Matrix. When he asks Morpheus if he could return, Morpheus responds by asking him if he would want to. Horsley also describes the blue pill as addictive, calling The Matrix series a continuous series of choices between taking the blue pill and not taking it. He adds that the habits and routines of people inside the Matrix are merely the people dosing themselves with the blue pill. While he describes the blue pill as a common thing, he states that the red pill is one of a kind, and something someone may not even find.

=== Literary and philosophical allusions ===
The Matrix, and its sequels, contain numerous references to Lewis Carroll's 1865 novel Alice's Adventures in Wonderland and its 1872 sequel Through the Looking-Glass. The Alice in Wonderland metaphor is made explicit in Morpheus's speech to Neo, with the phrases "white rabbit" and "down the rabbit hole", as well as the description of Neo's path of discovery as "Wonderland". The concept of the red and blue pills has also been speculated to be a reference to the scene in Alice in Wonderland where Alice finds a cake labelled "Eat Me" and a potion labelled "Drink Me": eating the cake makes Alice grow to an enormous size, while drinking the potion makes her tiny.

=== Red pill as transgender allegory ===
Fans have put forward theories suggesting that the red pill represents an allegory for transgender people or a story of Lana and Lilly Wachowski's history as coming out as transgender. During the 1990s, a common transgender hormone therapy for trans women involved Premarin, a maroon-colored tablet, while a common antidepressant prescribed to closeted trans women at the time, Prozac, was blue. Lilly Wachowski confirmed in August 2020 that the filmmakers had indeed meant for the movie to have a "trans narrative". Answering the question: "What do you think of fans discussing the matrix's trans allegory?", she says: “I’m glad that it has gotten out that that was the original intention”.

== As a political metaphor ==
In a political context, the idea of redpilling means "waking up" to the supposed reality of the world, and is typically used as shorthand for radicalization into far-right politics. In right-wing online discussions, taking the red pill or being red-pilled means accepting the idea that the broader population has become deluded by left-wing politics, which seek to destroy Western world and culture. The metaphor of the red pill was appropriated by the far right from a loose association of anti-feminist blogs, websites, and forums known as the manosphere.

Among the far right, redpilling implies an acceptance of beliefs such as white supremacy, Holocaust denial, opposition to immigration, and antifeminism, which generally contradict mainstream beliefs. Research has indicated that people who have been redpilled on one such topic are more likely to be redpilled on others; disaffected young men most often take the path to white-nationalist radicalization via men's rights activism. Because of its common usage as a self-identifier among the alt-right and others who subscribe to right-wing beliefs, the term "redpilled" is sometimes used by others to refer to the right.

The metaphor was popularized in the context of right-wing politics by neo-reactionary blogger and software engineer Curtis Yarvin, writing under the pseudonym "Mencius Moldbug". In a 2007 essay titled "The Case Against Democracy: Ten Red Pills", Yarvin presented a set of "heretical theses" meant to provoke the reader to question aspects of liberal democracy.

== In the manosphere: the "red pill" ==
The concept of the "red pill" is a central tenet of the manosphere, a varied collection of websites, blogs, and online forums promoting masculinity, misogyny and antifeminism. It concerns awakening men to the supposed reality that men are the oppressed gender in a society dominated by feminism. Manospherians believe that feminists and political correctness obscure this reality, and that men are victims who must fight to protect themselves. Accepting the manosphere's ideology is equated with "taking the red pill" (sometimes abbreviated TRP), and those who do not are seen as "blue pilled" or as having "taken the blue pill".

Such terminology originated on the antifeminist subreddit /r/TheRedPill started by Robert Fisher in 2012 and was later taken up by other groups within the manosphere, including pickup artists and men's rights activists. r/TheRedPill was quarantined by Reddit in September 2018 for being "dedicated to shocking or highly offensive content". At the time of the quarantine it had around 290,000 subscribers, and by June 2019 its subscriber count was reported as just over 400,000. It was concluded that quarantining reduced its visibility but did not eliminate misogynistic content or related communities on and off the platform.

White supremacy and right-wing nationalist ideals are present in the manosphere. These themes are secondary but remain relevant in online manosphere groups linked to extremist violence like the Oregon shooting in 2015 by Chris Harper and the Isla Vista killings in 2014 by Elliot Rodger. In multiple surveys done within the community, the results show the members to be predominantly white, heterosexual, conservative men from the ages 18–35.

Red pill ideology centers around the belief that men are systemically oppressed in a "gynocentric" world that dismisses men's needs and prioritizes women's voices. The community believes that male privilege is a myth that stems from the "apex fallacy" which is the idea that determining men's status based on a few successful individuals disregards male struggles on a larger scale. Members apply the mentality of AWALT ("All Women Are Like That") enforcing the idea that all women have negative characteristics and behavioral traits.

The rise of feminism and a progressive culture are claimed to be the reasons why men's issues are dismissed and why the red pill community is necessary. The subreddit r/TheRedPill organizes its core beliefs through its sidebar, which users are instructed to read before participating. The sidebar presents its worldview as grounded in empirical observation and popular evolutionary psychology. It identifies evolutionary psychology as central to developing the subreddit's stated "sexual strategy". The sidebar emphasizes concepts such as female hypergamy, dual mating strategies, as well as the "Alpha Fucks/Beta Bucks" model, which it describes as fundamental to understanding sexual behavior. It also uses economic terminology, including "sexual marketplace" and "sexual market value", to depict heterosexual relationships as market-based exchanges. The sidebar promotes "game" as set of learnable techniques intended to increase men's sexual success by mimicking traits associated with evolutionary advantage. It instructs men to interpret women's expressions of disinterest or emotion as strategic behaviors, including "rapport breaks" and "last minute resistance". The sidebar encourages men's emotional stoicism, describing it as necessary for attracting patterns. It characterizes men's desire for emotional connection as a conditioned illusions and urges for readers to reject such desires. The sidebar further incorporates neoclassical economic ideas that frame sex as a form of exchange between "buyers" and "sellers". It also discusses technologies such as sex robots and predicts future "devaluation" in the sexual marketplace.

=== Popular figures in red pill communities ===
In order to make such a widespread impact, the red pill community has had numerous influential figures that have extended the reach of Red-pill and manospheric communities, argued as one of the most notable being Andrew Tate. Tate first gained traction in misogynistic communities around 2016, after making bigoted comments on Twitter, but also being removed from his time on reality TV show Big Brother over a video of him beating a woman with a belt was made public. Since then, Andrew Tate has made an online presence for himself based on openly Red-pill, misogynistic, and far-right, and even Nazi-like beliefs and actions. He started multiple online private communities such as "The Real World", an app based on the red-pill metaphor's origins in The Matrix, focused on being an alternative to the feminist, progressive, and non-traditionalist society that Tate's male teenage audience so despises, and quickly acting like an "online grooming" and "cult-like". The app was banned in 2023 by Google due to being exposed as a pyramid scheme. Andrew Tate also has a long history of criminal charges ranging from sexual assault and rape dating back to 2015, to being detained in Romania for human trafficking charges.

Red-pill communities often spread their beliefs through clipped segments reposted onto short form content platforms like TikTok, Instagram Reels, YouTube Shorts, etc. Though Andrew Tate is a large figure in this movement, plenty of other self-proclaimed misogynist podcasters and online content creators have gained traction in the last 5-7 years. One of these is Fresh and Fit Podcaster Myron Gaines, also known as Amrou Fudl. Every Wednesday, the podcast has "Red-pill Wednesdays", where Gaines and his brother discuss dating advice from a male-centric and misogynistic viewpoint. Myron frequently hosted Nick Fuentes, another far-right commentator who promotes white nationalism, holocaust denial, misogyny, and plenty of other red-pill ideologies.

Other prominent figures in the red-pill community include Adin Ross, Sneako, and Hamza Ahmed.

=== Beliefs about women and feminism ===
Participants in red pill communities work to exclude women from taking part in online manosphere communities which advertise themselves as male only spaces. They explain that having female participants would pose a threat to male dominance. In order to keep women out of space catered to men, members of the manosphere create an environment where any potential female participants are met with harassment, doxing, and threats.

As red pill men understand it, heterosexual romantic relationships usually benefit women who use men for financial purposes. Thus, they believe women are always looking for men of higher social statues than their own, which is known as hypergamy.This point of view has led to the red pill belief that women use men, without assisting men in return. If women do not engage sexually with men, that is seen as a manipulation tactic.

Once women exit their youthful stage which is around their mid-twenties, red pill community members believe they are no longer attractive and cease to have worth as human beings.

The red pill community believes equality was achieved by second-wave feminism to women's benefit, and shares a hatred of the feminist movement. Rather than securing equality, red pill believes that third-wave feminism’s true goal is to place women in a position of power over their male counterparts.

The red pill community holds that the societal power that women have over men has led more men into becoming “betas,” men who are not sufficiently masculine, physically or psychologically, and who are undesirable to women.

=== Women's participation in Reddit and red pill communities ===
Female communities are also a part of the manosphere despite other assumptions, such as Trad-Wife and Femcel communities, which appear to encourage a similar level of violence as their male counterparts. Just like the men in the Red-pill communities, the women preach themes of the "alpha" man being genetically superior, and "beta" men being infinitely inferior and pathetic, and in every scenario the woman needing to be silent and subservient to the man, equally echoing sentiments of white supremacist and right-wing ideologies that outwardly reject modern ideals, especially feminism. In Red-Pill feminine communities, women idealize a past that is centered around white ideologies and the American, white, heteronormative 50's family dynamic. In this fantasy, the women in these communities embrace the ideals that so oppress them and submit to the male ideal in whatever way that may mean, even if it means being stripped of basic rights and being abused in numerous ways.

The exclusion of women from Red pill communities has led to the creation of another subreddit formulated solely for women called r/RedPillWomen (abbreviated to RPW). In April of 2024, the RPW subreddit had more than 72,000 participants. Similarly to Red pill men, Red pill women use evolutionary psychology as a basis for their beliefs. A core idea of r/RedPillWomen is that women should be submissive to their dominant male counterparts. RPW users also believe that they should only be subordinate to "high-value" men. Although RPW falls under the wider umbrella of Red pill communities in the manosphere, RPW are critical of how Red pill men characterize women as animalistic and selfish. Participants often speak about gender roles in a way that suggests it is men and women's innate nature to act within the Red Pill idealistic standard, where men naturally give up more in their day to day bring home money and burden the load of familial leadership, and the women give their piece through participating in taking care of the home and children and submitting in exchange for financial and lifetime security. Women are still allowed to have their standards, being encouraged to seek "High Value Men", which are men that fulfill Red Pill ideals. For RPW, their traditionalist role is not about being undeserving of the rights or respect of men, it is that they believe that women can only be fulfilled and happy through a lifestyle where they kneel down to the men in their lives and become a mother and a homemaker. The RPW are aware of their own burdens and the obstacles they have to face when persisting in their lifestyle, namely upkeeping their appearance 100% of the time for the sake of the male gaze. Some women in the RPW community cite themselves feeling worthless and like they feel oppressed and uncomfortable with the things they see in their own communities, despite not choosing to abandon the lifestyle.

Men are not allowed to contribute to the subreddit r/RedPillWomen unless they are verifiably a Red pill Man. To verify that they are a Red pill Man, they must have demonstrably taken part in the subreddit TRP.

=== LGBTQ+ identities ===
Red pill ideology defines a "real man" as heterosexual, dominant, and attached to traditional gender roles. Scholars who study Red pill and incel communities describe how people within these communities rely heavily on hegemonic masculinity and place straight men at the top of the social hierarchy. Anyone else is considered inferior and a threat. Since Red pill views are centered on heterosexual interactions between men and women, LGBTQ+ identities do not fit into the "natural" view of these communities. Queer people are instead ignored or used as evidence of what they believe is "declining masculinity," and LGBTQ Identities are depicted as being manufactured by society.

=== The "black pill" ===
The concept of the "black pill" developed on incel ("involuntarily celibate") forums as a more nihilistic critique of the broader manosphere's red pill. Both worldviews portray women as superficial, manipulative, and hypergamous. Incels use the term hypergamy to argue that women seek high-status men in order to increase the social, economic and genetic potential of their offspring. Expanding upon the red pill belief that men are an oppressed group, black pill ideology uses pseudoscientific claims to argue that society at large, especially heterosexual mating, is set up to benefit women and physically attractive men. The black pill categorizes people within a three-tiered hierarchy, with a minority of "alpha males" and desirable females at the top, a majority of average-looking "normies" or "beta males" in the middle, and a minority of physically unpleasant male incels at the bottom. Adherents of the "black pill" believe it is impossible for unattractive men to escape this social hierarchy. Incels therefore perceive themselves to be an oppressed minority, despite being mostly white males with some degree of social privilege. On Reddit, notable figures within the incelosphere are described as having taken the black pill, such as mass murderer Elliot Rodger.

== Other uses ==
- In the 2004 book The Art of the Start, author Guy Kawasaki uses the red pill as an analog to the situation of leaders of new organizations, in that they face the same choice to either live in reality or fantasy. He adds that if they want to be successful, they have to take the red pill and see how deep the rabbit hole goes.
- Until they were removed from the Maemo operating system application installer in January 2010, certain advanced features were unlocked by a "Red Pill Mode" Easter egg to prevent accidental use by novice users but make them readily available to experienced users. This was activated by starting to add a catalog whose URL was "matrix" and then choosing to cancel. A dialog box would appear asking "Which pill?" with the choices "Red" or "Blue", allowing the user to enter red pill mode. In "Red Pill" mode, the installer allows the user to view and reconfigure system packages whose existence it normally does not acknowledge. In Blue Pill mode the installer displays only software installed by a user, creating the illusion that system software does not exist on the system.
- In the 2013 movie version of The Secret Life of Walter Mitty, when Ben Stiller's character lands at Nuuk in Greenland, he asks the man in the airport booth: "Do you have any cars available?" "Yes, we have a blue one and a red one", the man replies. "I'll take the red one", says Walter. "The choice between the red and blue car at the rental car lot is worthy of mention, if only because it almost candidly pulls the idea from the red pill of The Matrix. Two jelly bean, or pill, shaped cars [Daewoo Matiz], red and blue; the only thing missing is Lawrence [sic] Fishburne working the counter". "The passage connecting reality to illusion is often visualized using tangible things and physical environments [as] Neo took the red pill in The Matrix."
- The 2023 film Barbie contains an allusion to the dilemma. In one scene, Barbie is given the choice between continuing to live obliviously in Barbieland (represented by a pink stiletto heel) and entering the real world (represented by a plain Birkenstock sandal). At the end of the movie, in which Barbie now lives in the real world as a human, she is shown wearing light pink Birkenstock sandals.

== See also ==
- Based – Internet slang term
- Candide – 1759 satirical novella by Voltaire
- Denialism – Rejecting scientific or historical consensus
- Drinking the Kool-Aid – Expression
- Epiphany – Positive affect associated with sudden understanding
- Hyperreality – Term for cultural process of shifting ideas of reality
- Malo periculosam libertatem quam quietum servitium
- Páthei máthos
- Pollyanna principle – Tendency to remember pleasant things better
- Quid est veritas
- The Social Construction of Reality – 1966 book by Peter L. Berger and Thomas Luckmann
