= Zion (The Matrix) =

Last human city in The Matrix film series

Zion is a fictional city in The Matrix films. It is the last human city on the planet Earth after a cataclysmic war between humankind and sentient machines, which resulted in artificial lifeforms dominating the world. It is actually a massive series of caverns, located deep under the ruined planet's surface, close to the Earth's core, for warmth, power, and protection.

== Role within the franchise ==
Zion serves as a living space for humans who have chosen to be disconnected from the Matrix and fight against the machines that created it. The city is defended by a fleet of hovercraft, an infantry force, and a corps of soldiers who operate powered battle suits.

In The Matrix Reloaded, Neo learns from the Architect that the machines allowed Zion to be created as a method of coping with the problem of human choice, reducing but not eliminating the instability caused by those who rejected the Matrix. In order to prevent the entire system from crashing, the machines must periodically destroy Zion and "The One" must reboot the Matrix and choose a group of people to rebuild the city. Neo discovers that this cycle has occurred five times in the past and is about to complete its sixth repetition.

In The Matrix Revolutions, the machines tunnel their way down into Zion and invade, inflicting heavy casualties as the military forces mount a defense. They retreat and leave the city in peace after Neo succeeds in stopping the renegade program Agent Smith from destroying both the Matrix and the machine world.

== Religious meaning ==
Stephen Faller writes in his 2004 book Beyond the Matrix that Christianity is the most dominant religious theme in the Matrix films and that "Zion is biblically regarded as the city of God". The 2005 book Philosophers Explore the Matrix writes that "The last remaining human city, Zion, [is] synonymous in Judaism and Christianity with (the heavenly) Jerusalem".

== Racial matters ==
Faller says that Zion is presented as a contrast to the Matrix, "The racial constituency of Zion is much less European and Anglo than present-day America. We are shifting the paradigm from the racially charged medium of the Matrix, where the subtext is so clearly contrasted in the extremes of black and white, to the imagined world of Zion, which is dominated by people of color." One chapter in The Matrix Trilogy: Cyberpunk Reloaded writes, "Black spirituality is evoked in the Matrix films... by the use of Zion for the underground city of free humans populated primarily by black people, suggesting the dream of Christianised slaves to find a safe haven in 'the promised land' and the Rastafarian belief in an utopian society." Another chapter writes, "The Matrix Reloaded displays black 'life' in a scene reminiscent of countless Hollywood jungle melodramas when the predominantly black population of Zion engages in frenzied dancing to the pounding rhythm of drums. In Hollywood, the war between artifice and reality is drawn along racial lines." Adilifu Nama writes in Black Space: Imagining Race in Science Fiction Film, "The racial politics of Zion appears to be based on a multicultural model of racial equality and participation. In the Zion setting, a racial utopia is presented where blacks, whites, and other people of color live and work together, and in many cases whites are subordinate but not subservient to blacks."

== Post-September 11 allegory ==
In a paper published in 2006, cultural studies scholar Jon Stratton wrote that after the September 11 attacks, the narrative shifts from confronting the Matrix in the 1999 film to saving Zion in the 2003 sequels. It writes, "Reloaded and Revolutions plays out this conservative fantasy with Zion as the beleaguered site of humanist values and machines with their terrifying weapons of mass destruction threatening finally to destroy the last remnants of human independence."

== Io ==
Io is the new sister city of Zion in The Matrix Resurrections. Niobe explains to Neo that in the 60 years following the end of the war, enough humans left the Matrix to cause a severe power shortage for the machines. The machines fought each other over the limited resources, but some of them sympathized with the displaced humans and helped them found the city of Io, leading to peaceful coexistence between human and machine inhabitants. Most of Zion was destroyed during the Machine Civil War.

== See also ==
- Simulated reality
