= The Matrix Online =

2005 massively multiplayer online role-playing game

- Developer: Monolith Productions
- Publishers: Sega; Warner Bros. Interactive Entertainment
- Director: The Wachowskis
- Producers: Joel Silver; Troy Skinner
- Artist: Kevin Kilstrom
- Writer: Paul Chadwick
- Composer: Nathan Grigg
- Engine: Lithtech Discovery
- Platform: Microsoft Windows
- Release: NA: March 22, 2005; EU: April 15, 2005
- Genre: Massively multiplayer online role-playing game
- Mode: Multiplayer

The Matrix Online (abbreviated as MxO) is a discontinued massively multiplayer online role-playing game (MMORPG) initially developed by Monolith Productions and later, a few months after launch, by Sony Online Entertainment. It was advertised as a continuation of the storyline of The Matrix films, as The Wachowskis, the franchise's creators, gave their blessing to the notion of gamers "inherit[ing] the storyline". The game began closed beta-testing in June 2004 which was then opened for people who pre-ordered the game in November 2004. Warner Bros. and Sega released MxO on March 22, 2005, in the United States. It was released in Europe on April 15, 2005. In June, Warner Bros. sold the rights to the game to Sony Online Entertainment, and the game's development and operation was transferred to the latter on August 15, 2005. Sony Online Entertainment shut down operation of the game on July 31, 2009.

Ubisoft backed out of an agreement to co-publish the game, not long after canceling plans for another MMORPG. Ubisoft and Warner Bros. stated that this did not have a negative impact on their relationship. At the time, doubts about the game circled within the industry, based on the lackluster reception of the second and third The Matrix films and an overcrowded MMORPG market.

== Gameplay ==
In The Matrix Online, the player assumes the role of a redpill, a human who was formerly trapped inside the Matrix and has since been freed and shown the truth of humanity's imprisonment. When creating a new character, the player is given the choice of taking a blue pill that will return them to their former life (quit the game) or a red pill, which will free their mind from the Matrix and allow them to take the body of a physical human and experience reality. Characters who are unaware of the fact that they are in the simulation are often referred to as "bluepills" because they have either taken the blue pill or have not been given the choice yet. People who are aware of the simulation (players) are referred to as "redpills" because they have taken the red pill (or, in very rare cases, when a character has self-substantiated out of the Matrix on their own). Following the choice between the two pills, the player is then taken through a basic tutorial of the game's mechanics, including mission interaction and the combat system. After the tutorial, they are then free to roam the Mega City (the large metropolis that the entire Matrix story is set in).

=== Combat ===
Combat in the game is divided into two separate parts: Free-fire and Interlock. Free-fire mode allows for large gun battles to take place, while Interlock is often broken down into bullet-time-affected martial arts moves and close-quarters gunfire.

There are three main classes in The Matrix Online: Coder, Hacker, and Operative. Coders create a special "simulacrum" that fights for them. Hackers manipulate the code of the Matrix to affect friends and enemies from a distance, either damaging them, downgrading their combat abilities, or healing them and upgrading their powers. Operatives are the common soldiers seen from the movies - Martial Artists, Gunmen, and the new Spy class, which revolves around stealth fighting and knife throwing. Magazines never seem to run out of bullets and knife throwers also have an unlimited supply.

In free-fire mode, operatives exchange damage with each other. Gunmen and Hackers are well-equipped for this, with their ranged attacks and abilities. Martial Artists must get close to their targets to be effective, and although a Spy's most dangerous abilities are initiated out of Interlock, they also pull their opponents into Interlock. Each attack or ability is used at timed intervals, based on the system of damage per second (D.P.S.). For example, the strongest rifle in the Matrix does 15 damage points per second and has a fire rate of 3.5 seconds, which, in free-fire, causes the rifle to have a base damage of 52.5, to be altered by the player's own stats. Opposed to such, a Hacker's stronger attack ability such as Logic Barrage 4.0 does 63 D.P.S., but with a short casting timer, does base damage of only 120-180 damage.

In Interlock or Close Combat, two players exchange damage in rounds. Each round lasts exactly four seconds. For each round, the two players' accuracies are pitted against each other's defenses, which are slightly affected by a random "luck" roll. There are three different outcomes to a round: hit-hit, hit-miss, or miss-miss. In hit-miss, one of the players will hit the other while dodging or blocking their attack. In miss-miss, both players will parry each other without doing damage. In hit-hit, one player will damage the other, only to be damaged themselves in a counterattack. When special abilities are used, however, there can be no hit-hit round, although the miss-miss round can still apply.

When taking or dealing damage, one player's damage influences are pitted against another player's resistance influences of the same damage type (i.e. a gunman's ballistic damage versus an opponent's ballistic resistance). Higher resistance versus lower damage means that the defending player will not take as much damage.

When attacking or defending against attacks, one player's accuracy influences are pitted against another's defense influences of the same attack type.

There is no turn-based combat in the Matrix Online. All combat takes place in "real-time", and large-scale battles are often decided by the sheer numbers of forces of one side versus others. Amassing a large number of players to control the battlefield is affectionately dubbed "zerging".

Items that characters drop in the game world can be picked up, granting powers to the player that lugs them around. These are called "luggables".

=== Classes ===
The Matrix Online has a unique class system. Players can load abilities they have either purchased or produced (by the Coder class, known in-game as coding) at Hardlines, provided they have enough memory and the abilities that precede the loading one. These abilities can then be switched out at a Hardline at a moment's notice. This leads to a very flexible class system, without players being stuck in one class.

The three main archetypes are Hacker, Coder, and Operative. They are similar to the classes Mage, Crafter, and Fighter in other MMORPGs. These classes then branch out into sub-classes, with Coder, for example, is divided into Programmer (out of a battle item and ability maker) and Code Shaper (creates simulacrums to fight with, similarities to a necromancer/summoner in other MMOG's). The game has a total of 21 end-game classes with an additional two stubs.

=== Missions and organizations ===
After an initial set of introductory missions, players can join one of three organizations working in the Matrix, each with a different set of goals, beliefs, and methods: Zion, the Machines, and the Merovingian.

In order to receive increasingly critical and sensitive missions, players are expected to run missions for their chosen organization, which will increase their standing with their chosen organization but will also lower it with the other two.

Zion:

Zion is the last remaining human city on Earth, hidden deep underground and is concerned chiefly with protecting its citizens from the Machines who see those who have "awakened" as a threat to those still connected to the Matrix. Those who choose to work for Zion usually enlist in the Zion Military and see this as the best way to protect the ideals of freedom.

Machines:

The main motivation for choosing to side with the Machines is that this organization is seen as the most conducive towards maintaining the status-quo of the Matrix and protecting the lives of those still connected to it, i.e., bluepills. However, there are also those who feel that the only way to improve relations between man and machine is to work with them as closely as possible and see joining this organization as the best way to do so.

Merovingian:

Those who work for the Merovingian are in a unique position in that they need not concern themselves with the traditional hostilities between Zion and the Machines, preferring instead to act only when the situation would prove advantageous for themselves or the organization as a whole. However, this organization has also been chosen by some players as it is the only one out of the three that fights to protect the Exiles who reside within the Matrix.

Sub-organizations:

Players cannot run missions for these organizations although in storyline terms they are now quite separate from their original "parent" organization, even receiving their own Live Events:

- EPN - E Pluribus Neo (Zion as parent organization):

Members of EPN are devoted to what they deem "Neo's legacy". This mostly involves giving all human beings the opportunity to question the true nature of their "reality", the Matrix, and to have the choice of the red or blue pill. Very much against the Machines, and Cypherites in particular, there are some more fundamentalist schools of thought within this organization who believe that the only solution to humanity's problems is to free the entire human population from the Matrix. They are led by The Kid with his old friend, Shimada - who also acts as their mission controller.

- Cypherites (Machines as parent organization):

Usually seen as the more extreme elements of the Machine organization, Cypherites follow in the footsteps of Cypher, wanting to be reinserted into the Matrix as bluepills so that they may be blissfully unaware of the true nature of the Matrix as a computer program. The name of their hovercraft, Blue Dreamer, reflects this philosophy. They are currently led by Cryptos and his second-in-command, the Zion traitor, Veil. During the time that Cryptos was revealed to be a Machine Program inhabiting a redpill's body, Veil assumed control of the organization.

Following Chapter 11.3, the Cypherites and EPN were effectively withdrawn as playable organizations within the game. Existing factions that were granted their respective "EPN/CYPH" tags in their faction names continued to hold said tags unless they disbanded or reformed, but no new splinter org tags were granted. In addition, no further Live Events occurred for these organizations.

== Continuing story ==
Another of The Matrix Online's defining and differentiating aspects was its inclusion and emphasis on what was called "The Continuing Story". This is to say the game itself is the official continuation of the universe, story and characters established in The Matrix series of fictional works including the film trilogy, The Animatrix short films, the Enter the Matrix video game and a series of officially written and produced Matrix comic books.

This continuation was written by comic book writer Paul Chadwick. It was also confirmed as having seen verification and input from Matrix creators The Wachowskis through the end of Chapter 9.

=== Progression of the storyline ===
The story progressed in real time, with a planned schedule in effect that included the following:

- Nine new critical missions (three for each of the game's three main organizations) every six weeks, released weekly as part of the game's patch cycle.
- A new hand-drawn cinematic every six weeks to coincide with the start of a new sub-chapter.
- Daily live events.
- Large-scale organizational meetings (one each month).

==== Chapter organization ====
The Matrix Online used a system of organization akin to that of software versioning to keep track of its chronological progression. Each "Critical" mission and development is given its own unique tag within this system.

For example: Chapter 1, sub-chapter 2, week 3 would be represented as 1.2.3.

It has been stated by MxO developer Rarebit, that this numbering system was meant purely for chronological measuring and game design (for the various rewards associated with completing past critical missions in a system called The Mission Archive). The chapters and sub-chapters are not intended as self-contained units. Rather, they are each equally relevant to the unfolding of the story as a whole.

=== LESIG program ===
The LESIG (Live Event Special Interest Group) was originally devised under Monolith's operation of the game to give developers insight into the player sentiment around live events, with the creation of a live events program, including the development of in-game event tools and server-specific event teams made of community members, as a long-term goal.

However, when The Matrix Online moved to Sony Online Entertainment, the program underwent a radical change in direction as part of similar changes to the other story telling devices, most importantly, the scale and frequency of live events following the departure of a dedicated Live Events Team.

The group were given the new task of playing minor supporting roles (known as organization liaison officers) during future live events or even more permanent characters to enhance interaction between players, essentially replacing the paid staff of the LET with volunteer players.

== Development ==
The game had a budget of $20 million. The game started its project in 2002 when Monolith Productions partnered with Warner Bros. Interactive Entertainment, then a licensing firm and a unit of Warner Bros. Consumer Products, to conceive the game. During production on the game, Monolith Productions was acquired by WBIE.

== Closing ==
In June 2009, Sony Online Entertainment stopped serving The Matrix Online due to low subscription numbers. The service was officially shut down on August 1, 2009. At the time, it had fewer than 500 active players.

The days leading up to the closing, as well as the end of the servers themselves, were chronicled on the gaming website Giant Bomb in a video series titled "Not Like This", a reference to a line in the first of the Matrix films.

After the closing, the website remained operational for a limited period of time. Visitors were greeted with an invitation to peruse the official memory book, which had been posted as a parting gift to the fans. The book included a summary of the storyline and various nostalgic items.

== Reception ==
Reception

Aggregate scores
Aggregator	Score
GameRankings	68%
Metacritic	69/100

Review scores
Publication	Score
1Up.com	C+
Computer Gaming World	3/5
Eurogamer	5/10
Game Informer	7.5/10
GamePro	3.5/5
GameSpot	7.3/10
GameSpy	3.5/5
GameZone	7.5/10
IGN	7.6/10
PC Gamer (US)	80%
Detroit Free Press	2/4
Maxim	6/10

The game received "mixed or average" reviews according to video game review aggregator Metacritic.

The Matrix Online sold just 43,000 copies in the U.S. from its March 22 debut through the end of April.

== See also ==
- Simulated reality
