= Keymaker =

Fictional character from The Matrix Reloaded

- The Matrix character
- Keymaker in his workplace
- First appearance: The Matrix Reloaded (2003)
- Last appearance: The Matrix: Path of Neo (2005)
- Created by: The Wachowskis
- Portrayed by: Randall Duk Kim
- Voiced by: Randall Duk Kim (Enter the Matrix); Peter Renaday (The Matrix: Path of Neo)

In-universe information
- Alias: The Exile
- Species: Computer program
- Gender: Male
- Occupation: Key maker

The Keymaker is a fictional character, portrayed by Korean-American actor Randall Duk Kim, in the 2003 film The Matrix Reloaded. He is a computer program that can create shortcut commands, physically represented as keys, which can be used by other programs to gain quick access to various areas within the simulated reality of the Matrix. He appears as an elderly, bespectacled Korean man dressed in a button-down shirt, smock, and an apron hung with bunches of keys.

== Backstory and role ==
The Keymaker is an "Exile", a program whose usefulness has come to an end and that has chosen to hide in the Matrix rather than be deleted. The Oracle tells Neo that he will need the Keymaker's help in order to reach the Source, the machine mainframe; however, he is being held captive by a dangerous Exile known as the Merovingian. Neo, Morpheus, and Trinity are rebuffed when they demand that the Merovingian release the Keymaker, but his wife Persephone betrays him and takes them to where the Keymaker is being held: a small room in which he toils over a key-cutting machine. Thousands of previously made keys hang in bunches on the walls.

Morpheus and Trinity, separated from Neo, flee with the Keymaker as the Merovingian's Twins, the police, and three Agents (sent to terminate the Keymaker as he is an Exile) pursue them onto the city freeways. The Keymaker assists in the escape by quickly providing Trinity with the ignition key needed to start a motorcycle, saving her the time of waiting for hot-wiring instructions to be uploaded into her mind.

Following the escape, the Keymaker meets with three crews of Zion rebels to describe the security measures in place around the building which houses the door that leads to the Source. Two electric power stations must both be shut down in order to disable the alarm system, after which Neo will have only a short time to reach the Source before explosives destroy the building. In addition, if the door is opened while the alarm is still active or if anyone other than Neo tries to open it, the explosives will detonate. As the other two crews attack the power stations, the Keymaker leads Neo and Morpheus to a hall within the building, filled with doors that represent backdoor access to other parts of the Matrix.

They are interrupted by the arrival of Agent Smith and dozens of copies he has made of himself. The Keymaker hurriedly opens a door, allowing Neo and Morpheus to take cover inside a room as the Smiths open fire, but sustains gunshot wounds to the chest. Before dying, he gives Neo a single key on a chain around his neck—the one needed to reach the Source—and points Morpheus toward a door that will allow him to re-enter the Matrix proper.

== Role experience ==
Casting director Mali Finn succeeded in bringing Kim to the attention of the Wachowskis, the creators of the Matrix series. "Randall Duk Kim was cast for his talent, his presence and his voice," said Finn. After meeting the Wachowskis, Kim said he agreed to the Keymaker role "without a single bit of hesitation." Kim described the Keymaker as a character that belongs in The Wind in the Willows but then somehow ended up in Alice in Wonderland and then got lost in the Matrix. The Wachowskis' thoughts on Keymaker were coming on the spot as various takes were done. He is a creation of collaboration; for example, Lana Wachowski suggested that Kim cut his stride in half, so that the Keymaker's movements appeared as more of a scurry, than a normal gait.

In an interview with Tim Lammers to promote the DVD release of The Matrix Reloaded, Kim said, "I'm so happy to be part of such a wonderful tale as this. I was a fan before I even got the audition call for Reloaded". "When I got the part, you could hardly keep me from flying off the ground," Kim gleefully recalled. Despite the elaborate set-up and tireless hours, Kim said he could not get enough of the Matrix experience. "On every single day of that shoot I felt like a little kid on big adventure," Kim enthused. "And working for [the Wachowskis], they're childlike in their creativity—it's just contagious". Kim said further that the stunt drivers in the freeway motorcycle chase scene were some of the most amazing people he had ever met. "That was real. I would say Carrie and I did about three-quarters of what's seen up there," he revealed. Kim was backed by professional motocross racer David Barrett in a jump that was a double on the Ducati motorcycle used in the freeway chase. In a June 2001 interview, stunt player Debbie Evans said it was "pretty ambitious, because those bikes aren't made to do that sort of thing, but we pulled it off".

The Keymaker also appears in the short lampoon MTV Movie Awards Reloaded, produced for the 2003 MTV Movie Awards.

== See also ==
- Simulated reality
- Source code
