= The Matrix Awakens =

2021 video game and technology demonstration

- Promotional poster
- Developer: Epic Games
- Publisher: Epic Games
- Directors: Lana Wachowski; James McTeigue
- Producer: John Gaeta
- Programmer: Jeff Farris
- Artist: Jerome Platteaux
- Writers: Lana Wachowski; James McTeigue
- Engine: Unreal Engine 5
- Platforms: PlayStation 5; Xbox Series X/S
- Release: December 9, 2021
- Genre: Action-adventure
- Mode: Single-player

The Matrix Awakens is a 2021 action-adventure game and technology demonstration developed by Epic Games using Unreal Engine 5 in partnership with Warner Bros. Pictures, The Coalition, Wētā FX, Evil Eye Pictures, SideFX, and others for PlayStation 5 and Xbox Series X and Series S, serving as a marketing tie-in for the 2021 film The Matrix Resurrections.

Released during the 2021 Game Awards on December 9, 2021, it features Trinity (Carrie-Anne Moss) and Neo (Keanu Reeves), along with photorealistic 3D-scanned models of both Moss and Reeves from the present time, portrayed by themselves, in cinematic and QTE shooter scenes where the player can take control of IO, a character which Epic introduced with Unreal's MetaHuman creator tool.

While the demo did not get a PC release, Epic released the city environment in the demo as a sample project titled "City Sample" in their Unreal Engine 5 workshop. This was immediately used by fans to generate a Windows executable package in which the city can be navigated, offering the ability to control several parameters of the game engine. The assets were also reused later in several fan-made demos featuring characters such as Spider-Man, Superman, and Batman. The game was later delisted on July 9, 2022.

== Background ==
The demo was written and directed by Resurrections director Lana Wachowski, with many members of the team that worked on the first three Matrix films participating in the project, including John Gaeta, James McTeigue, Kym Barrett, and Kim Libreri, the chief technology officer of Epic Games.

== Reception ==
Eurogamer commented that the game looked a "suitable 4K" on PS5 and Xbox Series X by using temporal super resolution TSR technology for sub-native rendering. Ars Technica praised the demo's particle effects, ray tracing and lighting, and range of its draw distance. VentureBeat opined that this technology demonstration was "a pretty good sign that Epic Games is serious about building its own metaverse." GameSpot commented that The Matrix Awakens was "an impressive tech demo that does a lot to further blur the lines between games and films, and maybe even reality" as the narrative of the demo suggests.
