= Trinity (The Matrix) =

Fictional character in The Matrix

- The Matrix character
- First appearance: The Matrix (1999)
- Last appearance: The Matrix Resurrections (2021)
- Created by: The Wachowskis
- Portrayed by: Carrie-Anne Moss
- Voiced by: Carrie-Anne Moss (Enter the Matrix, The Animatrix); Jennifer Hale (The Matrix: Path of Neo)

In-universe information
- Nicknames: Trin, Tiffany (Note: As referred to her other name in Resurrections.)
- Gender: Female
- Title: First Mate of the Nebuchadnezzar
- Occupation: Hacker
- Fighting style: Budo; Krav Maga; Wushu; Jeet Kune Do
- Significant other: Neo
- Nationality: American

Trinity is a fictional character in the Matrix franchise. She is portrayed by Carrie-Anne Moss in the films. In the gameplay segments of Path of Neo, she is voiced by Jennifer Hale. Trinity first appears in the 1999 film The Matrix.

== Character overview ==
Like the series' other main characters, Trinity is a computer programmer and a hacker who has escaped from the Matrix, a sophisticated computer program where most humans are imprisoned. Though few specifics are revealed about her previous life inside the Matrix, it is told that she cracked a database so secure that she is famous among hackers, and that Morpheus, one of a number of real-world hovercraft commanders, initially identified her and helped her escape from the program. At the beginning of the series, she is first mate on Morpheus' Nebuchadnezzar and serves mainly as a go-between for him and the individuals he wishes to free from the Matrix. As the series progresses, her primary importance as a character becomes her close relationship with Neo. She is skilled with computers, at operating vehicles both inside and outside the Matrix, and in martial arts.

== Role in the films ==
=== The Matrix ===
Trinity is first introduced at the beginning of The Matrix, in a phone conversation with Cypher, which is heard offscreen. This cuts to a dingy hotel room fight scene between Trinity and a group of police officers. Also on hand are Agents, sentient programs that police the Matrix to pinpoint potential troublemakers and neutralize them.

Trinity is next seen communicating with Neo for Morpheus in several encounters. Eventually, she and the rest of the Nebuchadnezzar's crew unplug Neo from the Matrix and begin his training as a new recruit in the war against the machines. She participates in several missions into the Matrix, including taking Neo to The Oracle, a sentient program inside the Matrix who seems, almost paradoxically, to possess greatly enhanced powers of intuition and foresight.

Throughout the film, it is apparent that Trinity has been in love with Neo from afar for some time, although she continues to conceal her feelings for him. Near the end of the first film, after Neo is killed by Agent Smith inside the Matrix, she speaks to his interfaced physical body and reveals that the Oracle told her that she would fall in love with The One, a prophesied individual capable of manipulating the Matrix to an unprecedented degree. She then kisses him, whereupon he miraculously returns to life both in the real world and within the Matrix. The resurrected Neo easily defeats the three Agents and returns to his body back on the ship. The first film ends with Neo returning to the Matrix to show people still unknowingly trapped there what they, too, might achieve someday. This marks the beginning of a romantic relationship between Neo and Trinity which proves decisive in the outcome of the series.

=== The Matrix Reloaded ===
In The Matrix Reloaded, the second film in the series, Trinity aids in the rescue of the Keymaker from the Merovingian and in the subsequent escape. Later, when the crews of the Nebuchadnezzar and two other ships team up to destroy an electric power station so that Neo can reach the Source (the machine mainframe), Trinity stays out of the Matrix at Neo's request. However, she later enters the Matrix after the mission goes wrong and is mortally wounded by an Agent's gunshot. At the same time, Neo is given a choice by the Architect between reaching the Source and preserving humanity, or returning to the Matrix to save Trinity. He chooses to save Trinity, interfacing with the computer code of her virtual self to extract the bullet and restart her heart.

=== The Matrix Revolutions ===
In The Matrix Revolutions, the third installment of the Matrix series, Trinity helps rescue Neo from a cut-off segment of the Matrix, where he is being held by a program in the employ of the Merovingian. In the real world, Trinity goes with Neo to the Machine City in an attempt to negotiate with the Machines. While attempting to evade Machine pursuers, their hovercraft crashes, and Trinity is fatally impaled by a piece of rebar. She dies in Neo's arms, and he negotiates a truce with the Machines to enter the Matrix and wipe out the Agent Smith infection. Afterward, the Architect meets with the Oracle and promises that any humans wishing to leave the Matrix will be freed.

=== The Matrix Resurrections ===
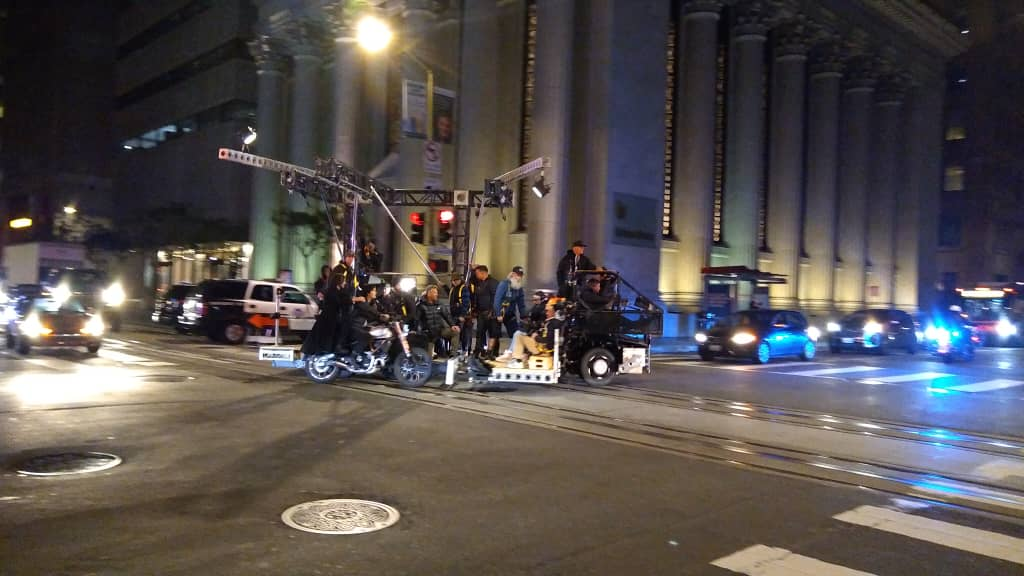
Carrie-Anne Moss, who portrays Trinity, and Keanu Reeves (Neo) on the set for The Matrix: Resurrections

In the fourth film The Matrix Resurrections, during the 60 year time period after Trinity's death in the Machine City, and the subsequent end of the Machine War, her body was recovered by the machines and is revived, only appearing to age twenty years due to the machine's modifications. Trinity was reinserted into the Matrix, where she was given the name "Tiffany" and became a married mother of three. She kept her penchant for motorcycles, working in a motorcycle workshop. She comes into contact with Neo at Simulatte, as his original identity of Thomas Anderson and she begins to feel that something is not right with her life.

After Neo is reawakened, he sees Trinity's still-plugged-in body in a pod across from him before he is retrieved by machines allied to the humans. Neo enacts a plan to rescue her, but is interrupted by the Analyst; who enters Bullet Time to stop Neo and Trinity from reaching each other. The Analyst reveals that as a machine he had rebuilt Neo and Trinity in the real world by discovering that by keeping Neo and Trinity close but not too close to each other they generated a new form of energy that could give more power to the machines when channeled through the Matrix. Then he built a new matrix with that in mind, posing as its new Architect. In order to keep them subdued, the Analyst suppressed all memories of their life before reinsertion and invented a family for Tiffany in order to dissuade Neo from attempting to form a romantic relationship with her, while himself posing as a therapist for Neo. He also created an illusion that covered their real faces.

After Sati contacts Niobe, Neo enacts a new plan to rescue Trinity, agreeing to the Analyst's terms that if Trinity chooses to remain Tiffany, then he will surrender. Tiffany arrives at Simulatte and she appears to reject Neo. However, before her husband can take her from Simulatte, Trinity wakes up and rejects the life created by the Analyst. The Analyst enters Bullet Time again to try and kill Trinity, but is killed by Smith; who can also enter Bullet Time, with a purging gun. Trinity and Neo fight the Analyst's and suites forces and escape into a skyscraper, where they are pursued by helicopters. Neo destroys the helicopters, but they are surrounded by police. Neo and Trinity jump from the building, and Trinity is revealed to have developed the ability to fly on her own and they do not die as she saw in her nightmare.

After Trinity is released from the Matrix, she embraces Neo. They re-enter the Matrix to tell the (apparently) alive Analyst that they plan on redesigning the Matrix as they see fit and to warn him to stay out of their way and the Analyst mentions that the leaders of machines, "the suits", did not purge him. The two then fly off together, circling each other while holding hands.

== Other appearances ==
In the video game Enter the Matrix, Trinity appears in a scene where she faces off against Ghost in a practice spar, the two subsequently discussing their shared belief that Neo can defeat the Machines. Over the course of the game, it is heavily implied, although never expressly stated, that Ghost is in love with Trinity, but that she regards him as a brother for their having been freed from the Matrix at or near the same time.

Her role in The Matrix: Path of Neo is relatively similar to her appearances with Neo in the films; she has a spar with him during his sword-fighting training, accompanies him during the raid on the military building to rescue Morpheus (subsequently helping him to defeat an Agent on the rooftop), and is later rescued by him from some attacking Agents after the last meeting with the assorted ship captains.

Trinity also appears in The Animatrix and The Matrix Comics.

In 2025, Carrie-Anne Moss reprised the role in a Lay's commercial alongside Keegan-Michael Key as Morpheus. It was directed by Taika Waititi.

=== The Matrix Online ===
Despite having "died" during the course of the third film, Trinity made a return to the series in the official continuation, The Matrix Online. Taking on a major role in the game's final chapters it is revealed both she and Neo are actually the culmination of decades of Machine research into translating human DNA perfectly into Machine code, allowing them to interface directly with technology without the need for simulated interfaces. Originally developed by The Oracle, this program is called The Biological Interface Program and is strongly sought after by the Oligarchy as a means to transfer their digital minds to physical bodies instead of the mechanical androids they had developed.

Without a physical form, Trinity takes the appearance of a floating figure made of golden code when within The Matrix. Initially distraught with her condition, she eventually finds solace in the fact her existence is the key to finally rebooting the Matrix and erasing Oligarch override control once and for all.

She ultimately meets her end in the Source of The Matrix, merging with a human inside the core of the Machine code base itself, combining the three core groups; Man, Machine and Program. This initializes the final reboot sequence, removing the Oligarch control and allowing the Machines to finally exist without fear of cruel masters.

== Casting choices ==
A certain number of actresses were considered for the role of Trinity. They include: Jennifer Connelly, Jada Pinkett-Smith, Janet Jackson, Marisa Tomei, Demi Moore, Ashley Judd, Salma Hayek, Angelina Jolie, Michelle Yeoh, Jennifer Lopez, Catherine Zeta-Jones, Drew Barrymore, Gabrielle Union, Kate Hudson, Uma Thurman, Jennifer Beals, Mariska Hargitay, Lucy Liu, Courteney Cox, Angie Harmon, Ming-Na Wen, Elizabeth Hurley, Sandra Bullock, Gillian Anderson, Heather Graham, Rosie Perez, Winona Ryder as well as Madonna who has revealed that she had turned the role down and has admitted regretting that decision.

== Name ==
The name "Trinity" is heavily associated with Christian theology, which involves the Trinity: the Father, Son, and Holy Spirit. When she cracks the IRS database before her release from the Matrix, she chooses the hacker handle "Trinity" to imply that she is as enigmatic as the concept of a "Three-In-One Being". Trinity is the force who guides Neo to his "salvation," as well as commanding Neo to rise up from his apparent death in the first film, implying a further parallel between her character and God.

The name Trinity increased in popularity as a given name for female babies born after the release of The Matrix in 1999. In the United States, the name had been increasing in popularity throughout the 1990s, and was the 523rd most popular by 1998. In 1999 it was 209th, and in 2000 it was 74th. It peaked as 48th most popular in 2004 and 2005, and remained in the top 100 female baby names until 2012.

== Skills and abilities ==
Throughout the Matrix franchise, Trinity is shown to have many skills both inside and outside the Matrix, including martial arts, computer hacking, the use of firearms and other weapons, and operating a range of vehicles. Some of these skills can be downloaded from outside the Matrix as needed, such as when Trinity flies a helicopter during the first film. Other skills are trained or inherent.

Trinity is seen to be especially skilled at the use of cars, motorcycles, and other vehicles, even in comparison to other hackers. In the first film, she pilots a Bell 212 helicopter to help rescue Morpheus; even after its hydraulic system is damaged, she maintains control long enough to get Neo and Morpheus to safety, then jumps out before it crashes. In The Matrix Reloaded, she drives a Cadillac sedan with ease while being chased by the Merovingian's twins, agents of the Matrix, and the police; even able to drive while helping Morpheus protect the Keymaker from one of the twins. She also carries the Keymaker to safety on a Ducati 996 motorcycle in a harrowing chase through oncoming traffic.

Trinity also excels in combat, both armed and unarmed. At several times during the three films, she is able to defeat large numbers of well-armed opponents, either by herself or with help from other characters.

In The Matrix Resurrections, Trinity develops the same reality warping powers as Neo after being reawakened to her true identity. By touching hands, Neo and Trinity can let out a powerful telekinetic shockwave and she is later able to manipulate the appearance of the Analyst with just snaps of her fingers. Trinity also develops Neo's ability to fly after they jump off of a roof and he can't fly himself. At the end of the movie, Trinity and Neo fly off together, playfully circling around each other.

== See also ==
- List of female action heroes
- Simulated reality
