= The Matrix Resurrections =

2021 film by Lana Wachowski

- Release poster
- Directed by: Lana Wachowski
- Written by: Lana Wachowski; David Mitchell; Aleksandar Hemon
- Based on: Characters by The Wachowskis
- Produced by: James McTeigue; Lana Wachowski; Grant Hill
- Starring: Keanu Reeves; Carrie-Anne Moss; Yahya Abdul-Mateen II; Jessica Henwick; Jonathan Groff; Neil Patrick Harris; Priyanka Chopra; Jada Pinkett Smith
- Cinematography: Daniele Massaccesi; John Toll
- Edited by: Joseph Jett Sally
- Music by: Johnny Klimek; Tom Tykwer
- Production companies: Warner Bros. Pictures; Village Roadshow Pictures; Venus Castina Productions
- Distributed by: Warner Bros. Pictures
- Release dates: December 18, 2021 (Castro Theater); December 22, 2021 (United States)
- Running time: 148 minutes
- Country: United States
- Language: English
- Budget: $190 million
- Box office: $160.2 million

The Matrix Resurrections is a 2021 American science fiction action film co-produced and directed by Lana Wachowski, who co-wrote the screenplay with David Mitchell and Aleksandar Hemon. It is the fourth installment in The Matrix film series and the sequel to The Matrix Revolutions (2003). The film stars an ensemble cast including Keanu Reeves, Carrie-Anne Moss, Yahya Abdul-Mateen II, Jessica Henwick, Jonathan Groff, Neil Patrick Harris, Priyanka Chopra Jonas, Lambert Wilson, Christina Ricci, Freema Agyeman, and Jada Pinkett Smith. Set sixty years after Revolutions, the film follows Neo, who lives a seemingly ordinary life as a video game developer having trouble with distinguishing fantasy from reality. A group of rebels, with the help of a programmed version of Morpheus, free Neo from a new version of the Matrix and fight a new enemy that holds Trinity captive.

Following the release of Revolutions, the Wachowskis denied the possibility of another Matrix film. Warner Bros. constantly expressed interest in reviving the franchise, hiring Zak Penn to write a new screenplay after the Wachowskis refused every offer to create more sequels. In late 2019, a fourth Matrix film was finally announced, with Lana Wachowski returning as director without Lilly, and Reeves and Moss reprising their roles. Filming started in February 2020, but was halted the next month by the COVID-19 pandemic. Wachowski considered abandoning the film, but was encouraged by the cast to finish it. Filming resumed in August and concluded three months later.

The Matrix Resurrections premiered at the Castro Theater in San Francisco on December 16, 2021, and was released theatrically and via the HBO Max streaming service by Warner Bros. Pictures on December 22. The film received positive reviews from critics, but underperformed at the box office, grossing only $160.2 million worldwide against a $190 million production budget. It received a nomination for Best Special Visual Effects at the 75th British Academy Film Awards. A sequel is currently in development, with Drew Goddard attached to write and direct.

== Plot ==
A young woman named Bugs learns that the Matrix is running old code in a loop, enacting the moment when Trinity first found Neo within the Matrix. (Note: As depicted in The Matrix (1999).) Bugs discovers a program embodying Morpheus and helps free him from the simulation.

In San Francisco, Thomas Anderson is the creator of a video game series called The Matrix, based on his faint memories as Neo. At a coffee shop, he regularly encounters Tiffany, a married mother with no recollection of her past, on whom Anderson based the game character Trinity. Anderson has created a simulation called a Modal to develop game characters. He struggles to separate perceived reality from dreams, a known concern among his co-workers and partner. Thomas's psychoanalyst prescribes him blue pills that he takes each day to suppress the occurrences, but he stops taking them. Meanwhile, as Bugs and Morpheus work to extract Neo from the Matrix, Anderson's business partner regains his memories as Agent Smith, Neo's former nemesis.

Neo awakens in a pod and notices Trinity confined in another nearby, before being extracted to Bugs's hovercraft Mnemosyne. Neo is brought to the human city Io, the sister city of Zion, where he reunites with an elderly Niobe. She explains that sixty years have passed in the real world since the Machine War ended, (Note: As depicted in The Matrix Revolutions (2003).) and that Neo's allies, including the original Morpheus, have all died over time. The peace achieved by Neo's sacrifice lasted for many years, but the large number of humans leaving the Matrix created a serious power shortage, causing the machines to fight over limited resources. Soon afterward, Zion was targeted in an attempt to get humans to use as the power supply once more. However, this attempt caused many machines, who still remembered Neo's sacrifice and the promise of peace, to turn on the others in order to protect the humans. This allowed most of Zion's citizens to escape. Io was then founded by both machines and humans who have been working together ever since against the remaining machines who want to return things to the way they were before the war.

Niobe refuses to risk Io's safety to help Neo free Trinity and confines him to his quarters. Bugs and her crewmates free Neo and enter the Matrix to contact Trinity. They are attacked by Smith and other exiled programs, including the Merovingian, but Neo and the Mnemosyne crew defeat them as Neo's abilities return. The group leaves and locates Trinity, but before Neo can talk to her, his therapist appears and immobilizes him by manipulating time. He reveals that he is The Analyst, a program designed to study the human psyche.

The Analyst explains that after Neo's and Trinity's deaths, he wanted to study Neo's body and his anomalous powers as The One and convinced his superiors to resurrect both of them. He discovered that due to The One's inherent connection to all humanity in the Matrix, manipulating Neo could make the Matrix produce more energy. Moreover, he found that the code anomaly in Neo was shared in his bond with Trinity, and that by suppressing their memories and keeping them close but always apart, the Matrix generated much more energy. Solving the energy crisis put The Analyst in a position to seize power from The Architect, after which he rebuilt the Matrix to control humans with emotional manipulation, claiming that humans generally believe what they want to believe. Neo's liberation destabilized the system and triggered a fail-safe to reboot the Matrix, but The Analyst stalled the reboot by convincing his superiors that threatening to kill Trinity would coerce Neo to return to his pod.

Neo and Bugs return to Io and talk to Sati, an exiled program that Neo previously met. Seeking to avenge her parents' deaths at the hands of the Analyst, Sati helps devise a plan to free Trinity. Back in the Matrix, Neo makes a deal with The Analyst: he will return to his pod if he fails to convince Trinity to leave the Matrix. Tiffany reaffirms her identity as Trinity while talking with Neo. Realizing that he has lost, The Analyst attempts to kill her, but Agent Smith appears and attacks him, seeking revenge for his own imprisonment after being restored as a result of Neo's resurrection.

Neo, Trinity, and the others escape in their vehicles, chased through the streets by hordes of bot programs and attack helicopters. As the last ones to be extracted from The Matrix, Neo and Trinity become cornered atop a skyscraper. Holding hands, they leap off and Trinity begins to fly, taking them to safety. With Trinity's newfound control over the Matrix, both return to confront The Analyst. They thank him for giving them a second chance by resurrecting them while they also express their contempt. Neo and Trinity fly off into the sky together, making plans to remake The Matrix.

== Cast ==
- Keanu Reeves as Neo / Thomas Anderson: The prophesied "One" from the previous version of the Matrix, Neo has been repaired by the machines and reinserted into a new version of the Matrix, with his memories suppressed in order to keep him under control. Despite sixty years having taken place since Neo's sacrifice, Neo has only aged twenty years thanks to the machines' modifications to his body. Steven Roy plays the embodiment of the original Neo, in reflections and various additional scenes.
- Carrie-Anne Moss as Trinity / Tiffany: Neo's romantic interest who was freed from the Matrix by Morpheus in the first film and killed at the end of the Machine War. The machines recover, repair and modify her body and reinsert her into a new version of the Matrix. As with Neo, her memories of her previous life are suppressed by the machines and she becomes Tiffany, a suburban mother-of-three with a penchant for motorcycles. Despite sixty years having passed since her death, Trinity has only aged twenty years thanks to the machines' modifications to her body.
- Yahya Abdul-Mateen II as Morpheus / Agent Smith: A program created as part of a modal by Neo who takes on traits of the original Morpheus, the hacker who originally freed him from the Matrix, as well as aspects of Neo's nemesis, Agent Smith. The character was portrayed by Laurence Fishburne in the previous films; Fishburne's version of the character appears through the use of archive footage and a memorial statue in the city of Io.
- Jessica Henwick as Bugs: A gunslinger with a White Rabbit tattoo, and captain of the hovercraft Mnemosyne. Henwick describes her character as "the audience's eyes".
- Jonathan Groff as Smith: Thomas' business partner and Neo's former arch-nemesis and Agent of the Matrix. The character was portrayed by Hugo Weaving in the previous films; Weaving also appears as Smith through the use of archive footage. To prepare for the role, Groff watched YouTube clips featuring Weaving's performance, rewatched the original trilogy and read Mary Shelley's Frankenstein, works of Philip K. Dick and Christopher Isherwood's The Berlin Stories, though he did not want to do an impression of Weaving, feeling more connected to the role during the fight sequences. As a result of his dedication during training for such sequences, Groff was nicknamed "The Savage" by a member of the stunt team.
- Neil Patrick Harris as the Analyst: The creator of the current iteration of the Matrix, who masquerades as Thomas' therapist, working closely with his patient to understand the meaning behind his dreams and to distinguish them from "reality" while keeping him within the Matrix.
- Priyanka Chopra Jonas as Sati: An exile program created without a purpose who met Neo shortly before the end of the Machine War. The character was portrayed by Tanveer K. Atwal in The Matrix Revolutions.
- Christina Ricci as Gwyn de Vere: A business executive at Thomas' video game company.
- Jada Pinkett Smith as Niobe: A general of the human bastion Io and former captain of the hovercraft Logos. Smith reprises her role from the previous two films. It took five hours to apply Smith's prosthetic makeup to create the appearance that her character had aged 60 years.
- Telma Hopkins as Freya: The head of botany in Io.
- Chad Stahelski as Chad: Tiffany's husband. Stahelski was Keanu Reeves' stunt double, as well as a stunt coordinator, for the previous films.
- Lambert Wilson as The Merovingian: A self-professed trafficker of information who encountered Neo prior to the end of the Machine War; he now seeks revenge on Neo for inadvertently stripping him of his purpose when the previous Matrix was destroyed. Wilson reprises his role from the previous two films.
- Freema Agyeman as Astra: A business executive at Thomas' video game company.
- Brian J. Smith as Berg: A crew member of the Mnemosyne who has studied Neo.
- Toby Onwumere as Sequoia: The operator of the Mnemosyne.
- Max Riemelt as Sheperd: Niobe's most-trusted captain at Io.
- Eréndira Ibarra as Lexy: A crew member of the Mnemosyne who idolizes Trinity.
- Purab Kohli as Zen

Additionally, Andrew Lewis Caldwell and Ellen Hollman appear as Jude and Echo, respectively. Julian Grey and Gaige Chat also appear as Tiffany's sons Brandon and Donnie, respectively. San Francisco mayor London Breed appears as Calliope, a member of Resistance. Daniel Bernhardt was announced to be reprising his role as Agent Johnson from The Matrix Reloaded, but his scenes were cut from the final film. Tom Hardy filmed an uncredited background cameo appearance, due to The Matrix Resurrections filming in San Francisco simultaneously with Venom: Let There Be Carnage, in which Hardy starred as Eddie Brock / Venom.

== Production ==
=== Development ===
I couldn't have my mom and dad... yet suddenly I had Neo and Trinity, arguably the two most important characters in my life. It was immediately comforting to have these two characters alive again, and it's super-simple. You can look at it and say: "Okay, these two people die, and okay, bring these two people back to life, and oh, doesn't that feel good?" Yeah, it did! It's simple, and this is what art does and this is what stories do. They comfort us and they're important.

— The origins of The Matrix Resurrections' story, as described by director Lana Wachowski

While making The Matrix films, the Wachowskis told their close collaborators that they, at the time, had no intention of making another film in the series after The Matrix Revolutions (2003). Instead, they gave their blessing to the notion of gamers "inherit[ing] the storyline" and The Matrix Online (2005) video game was billed as the official continuation. Rumors of a new installment began to circulate online in 2011 when it was reported that the Wachowskis had been planning two additional films in the series and had discussions with Keanu Reeves about reprising his role. Another rumor in 2014 claimed that the sisters had submitted a story treatment for a new Matrix trilogy to Warner Bros. These were later confirmed to be false.

In February 2015, in interviews promoting Jupiter Ascending (2015), Lilly Wachowski called a return to The Matrix (1999) a "particularly repelling idea in these times" when studios preferred to green-light sequels, reboots, and adaptations over original material, while Lana Wachowski, addressing rumors about a potential reboot, said they had not heard anything but believed the studio might be looking to replace them. At various times, Reeves and Hugo Weaving each confirmed their interest and willingness to reprise their roles in potential future installments of the Matrix films, with the stipulation that the Wachowskis were involved in the creative and production process.

According to producer James McTeigue, there was "always talk" of a fourth Matrix film within Warner Bros. even without the Wachowskis on board, though prior to 2019 they had not found the right concept. In March 2017, The Hollywood Reporter wrote that Warner Bros. was in the early stages of developing a relaunch of the franchise, with Zak Penn in talks to write a treatment and interest in getting Michael B. Jordan attached to star. The Wachowskis were not involved at that stage, although the studio had hoped for their blessing. The notion of a reboot or remake was denounced by Penn, and ideas for stories set in the already established universe were explored, including, reportedly, a prequel film about a young Morpheus or a sequel film from a descendant of his. In March 2018, Penn said he was working on a revival of the franchise and teased the possibility of an expanded universe. Penn clarified in October 2019 that he had been working on one of two Matrix projects at Warner Bros., and that his work was separate from the planned film. Penn's film did not go ahead in favor of Wachowski's film; Jada Pinkett Smith later reflected that handing the franchise's legacy to other filmmakers would have been a "horrendous mistake".

=== Pre-production ===
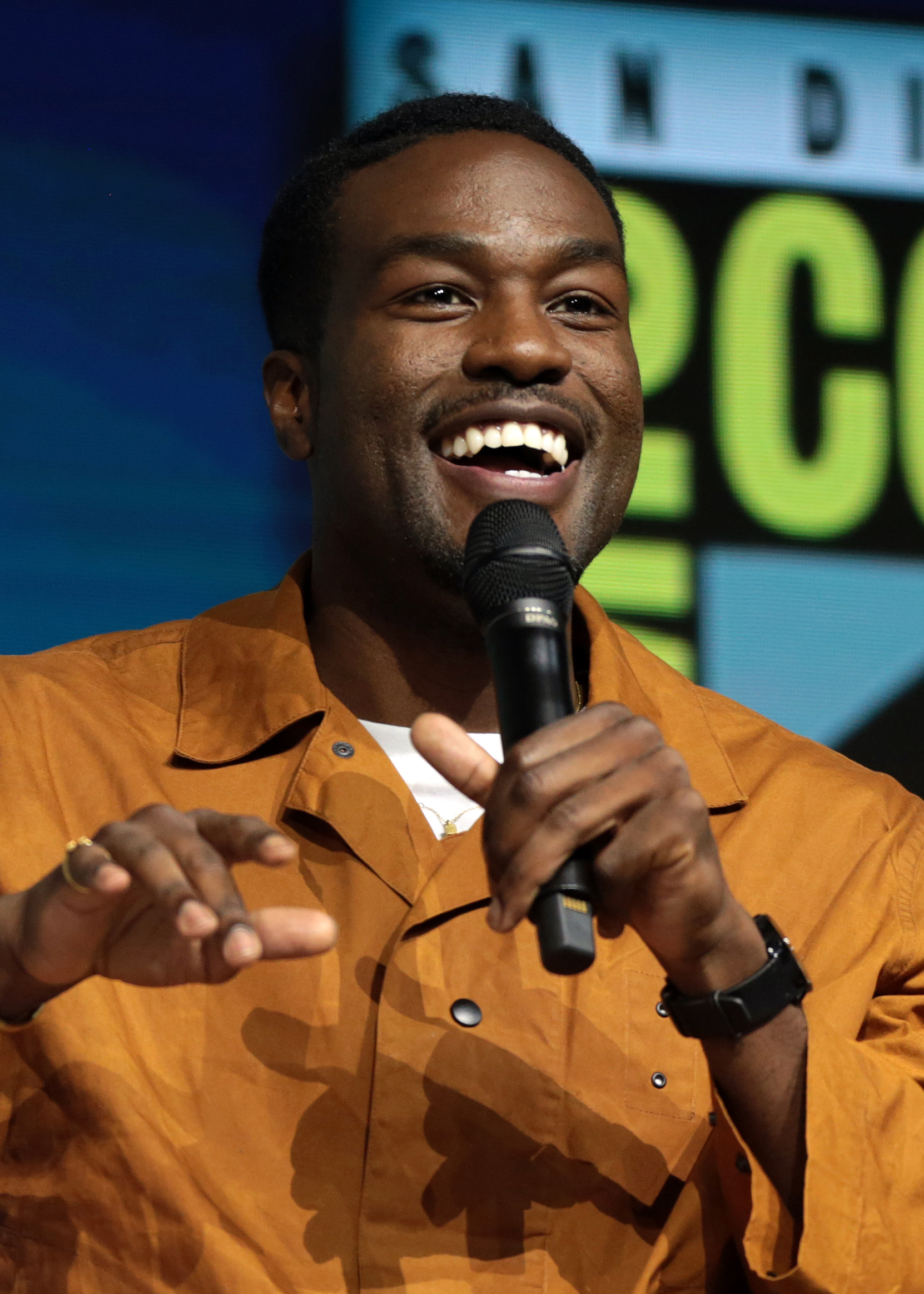
Yahya Abdul-Mateen II replaces Laurence Fishburne as Morpheus.

During the 2021 Berlin International Literature Festival, Lana Wachowski revealed that Warner Bros. had approached her and her sister every year about making another Matrix sequel, but she and Lilly always declined due to a lack of interest and because they felt the trilogy's story had concluded. However, Lana's feelings shifted in 2019, when she experienced the death of both her parents and a close friend. Struggling to cope with the grief, she conceived the story of The Matrix Resurrections one sleepless night. Although she could not bring her parents back, she thought it would feel comforting to have Neo and Trinity alive again. She approached Warner Bros. with her concept, and the studio readily accepted it, eager to have the franchise's creator aboard for the sequel, according to McTeigue.

The film was officially announced by Warner Bros. on August 20, 2019. Lana Wachowski returned as sole director, with Reeves and Carrie-Anne Moss confirmed to reprise their roles. The script was written by Wachowski, David Mitchell, and Aleksandar Hemon, who had previously written the series finale of Sense8 together. The Wachowskis also previously directed the 2012 film adaptation of Mitchell's novel Cloud Atlas (2004). Lilly Wachowski was not involved with the film due to work on the Showtime series Work in Progress (2019–2021), but gave her blessing to those involved to come up with a story even "better than the original". She said she needed time away from the industry to "reconnect with myself as an artist and I did that by going back to school and painting and stuff", and that she had been affected by the death of her parents. John Toll was hired as cinematographer that month. Toll was cinematographer on the Wachowskis' previous films Cloud Atlas and Jupiter Ascending, as well as every episode of Sense8.

=== Casting ===
Reeves and Moss were confirmed to be reprising their roles as Neo and Trinity upon the film's announcement in August 2019. In October 2019, Yahya Abdul-Mateen II was cast in the film, with some sources speculating he would be playing a young Morpheus, while Neil Patrick Harris was added in an undisclosed role. Following the first trailer's release, Abdul-Mateen II confirmed that he was indeed playing the role of Morpheus. Laurence Fishburne, who portrayed Morpheus in the original trilogy, announced in August 2020 that he was not asked to reprise his role as Morpheus; Fishburne later stated in April 2025 that he "offered his services" to reprise his role but the filmmakers did not "respond well" to his offer. Pinkett Smith entered negotiations to reprise her role as Niobe, with Jessica Henwick entering negotiations to join in an undisclosed role, later revealed as Bugs. Henwick was being considered by The Walt Disney Company to audition for a role in the Marvel Cinematic Universe (MCU) film Shang-Chi and the Legend of the Ten Rings (2021) at the same time she was offered to audition for the part of Bugs; in what she described as a "red-pill/blue-pill moment" for her, Henwick chose Resurrections over Shang-Chi. Jada Pinkett-Smith and Jessica Henwick were confirmed in December, along with the additions of Jonathan Groff and Toby Onwumere; Pinkett-Smith was convinced to return after learning from Wachowski how much the film meant for her. They went through a "couple different versions" for Niobe until they settled to depict the character in an elderly form.

In January 2020, Eréndira Ibarra was cast, with Priyanka Chopra entering final negotiations. That same month, Lambert Wilson, who played the Merovingian in the sequels, revealed he was in negotiations to return. Hugo Weaving, who starred in the franchise as Agent Smith, was originally approached to reprise his role, but he had scheduling conflicts with his involvement in Tony Kushner's theatrical adaptation of The Visit, leading Wachowski to conclude that the dates would not work after staying in touch with Weaving for a while. Weaving was later confirmed to be appearing in the film, but through archive footage from the original trilogy, while Groff was confirmed to have been cast as Smith in December 2021, replacing Weaving. Chopra and Wilson's castings were confirmed in February 2020, along with the additions of Andrew Caldwell, Brian J. Smith and Ellen Hollman. After some speculation, Chopra was revealed to be playing Sati in the film; the character was previously portrayed by Tanveer K. Atwal in Revolutions.

Joe Pantoliano, who appeared in the first film as Cypher, expressed interest in April 2020 in reprising his role despite his character's death in the first installment and messaged Lana Wachowski about the possibility of bringing him back, but received no response from her. In September 2020, it was announced Daniel Bernhardt was reprising his role as Agent Johnson from The Matrix Reloaded (2003). Christina Ricci was announced as part of the cast in June 2021; she had previously worked with the Wachowskis on Speed Racer (2008). Telma Hopkins was also announced to be part of the cast in September 2021. In December 2021, less than a week before the film's premiere, Henwick confirmed to have filmed a scene with a background cameo appearance of Tom Hardy, as Venom: Let There Be Carnage (2021) was being filmed simultaneously with Resurrections, though it is currently unclear if Hardy's appearance was kept in the finished film. After the film's Toronto premiere, it was confirmed that Chad Stahelski, who served as stunt coordinator in the previous films, appeared in the film as "Handsome Chad".

=== Filming ===
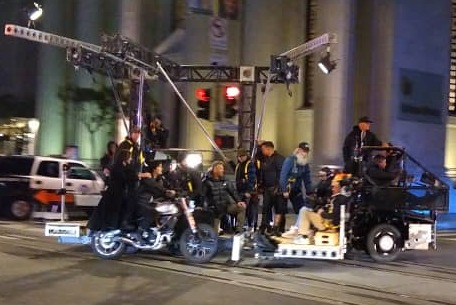
Keanu Reeves and Carrie-Anne Moss film a motorcycle scene in the Financial District of San Francisco (California Street and Sansome Street) under the direction of Lana Wachowski.

Unlike the previous films, which were shot predominantly in Australia, The Matrix Resurrections was filmed in the United States and Europe.

Under the code name "Project Ice Cream", the film began production in San Francisco on February 4, 2020. Filming also took place in Chicago. Filming in San Francisco caused irritation amongst residents and city workers after damage was inflicted to buildings and street lights. As in the case of other productions like Shang-Chi and the Legend of the Ten Rings and Venom: Let There Be Carnage, the producers had to pay $420,000 to the San Francisco Police Department so they could film in the city. As opposed to other productions, no second unit was needed during the action sequences as Wachowski directed all the scenes herself. Scott Rogers, a stunt performer who worked with Reeves in John Wick: Chapter 3 – Parabellum (2019) and John Wick: Chapter 4 (2023), was hired to be the film's stunt coordinator.

In March 2020, the production relocated to Studio Babelsberg in Potsdam, Germany. On March 16, 2020, production on the film was suspended due to the COVID-19 pandemic. After filming was halted, Wachowski contemplated the possibility of never finishing the film and letting it "go down as an incomplete legendary film not meant to be seen by anyone". However, the cast insisted Wachowski return and finish the film until she agreed. On August 16, 2020, Reeves confirmed filming had resumed in Berlin. Principal photography wrapped on November 11, 2020.

Wachowski's long-time camera operator, Daniele Massaccesi, took over as director of photography in the latter part of filming after original DoP John Toll left due to a health issue in his family.

The dialogue editing, sound mixing, sound design and sound editing with director Lana Wachowski took place in spring 2021 at the Babelsberg-based post-production company Rotor Film. Visual effects that allow space and time to appear offset on the screen were created with camera systems specially developed for Matrix Resurrections during outdoor shooting and in the volumetric studio called Volucap in Babelsberg as well as in the world's first volumetric underwater studio on the Babelsberg film studio premises. Volucap, a cooperation between Studio Babelsberg, Fraunhofer Society and UFA, worked on site for two years on Matrix Resurrections.

After finishing work on Matrix Resurrections, the co-producing Studio Babelsberg fitted its largest film studio (Stage 20) with rainbow colors and named it "Rainbow Stage" in honor of the Wachowskis. The Wachowskis, known for their commitment to people of diverse sexual orientations and identities, had previously directed several times in Babelsberg including, e.g., V for Vendetta (2006) and Cloud Atlas (2012).

=== Music ===
In September 2021, Warner Bros. confirmed that Johnny Klimek and Tom Tykwer would be scoring the film, having previously collaborated with Wachowski on Sense8 and Cloud Atlas, replacing Don Davis, who composed the score for the first three films. The 1967 song "White Rabbit" by Jefferson Airplane is prominently featured in the trailer and film. Wachowski said the choice of "White Rabbit" for the trailer not only was in reference to elements of Lewis Carroll's 1865 novel Alice's Adventures in Wonderland that The Matrix had previously used and which "White Rabbit" is based on, but also a nod to Jefferson Airplane themselves which was formed as a house band for The Matrix club in San Francisco. The second trailer featured an electronic/orchestral cover of the Rage Against the Machine song "Wake Up" by Sebastian Böhm. The original song featured prominently at the end of the first Matrix film, and Resurrections features in its ending a cover by Brass Against.

The film's score was released on December 17, 2021. A track from the album titled "Neo and Trinity Theme (Johnny Klimek & Tom Tykwer Exomorph Remix)" was released as a single on December 10.

== Marketing ==
On August 24, 2021, the title was revealed as The Matrix Resurrections. A trailer was screened as part of Warner Bros.' panel at CinemaCon that day, featuring a meeting between Neo and Trinity. Ahead of the film's first official trailer being released on September 9, the movie's official website was updated on September 7, presenting random clips of the trailer to the user and narration based on their time of day. A second trailer was released on December 6, 2021. By its opening weekend in the U.S. and Canada, the film had made 600.6 million impressions across Facebook, Twitter, Instagram, and YouTube, in part due to the exponential growth of HBO Max in 2021. According to RelishMix, "these stats run 2X over the norm for the genre as far as awareness and reach."

A tie-in video game tech demo titled The Matrix Awakens: An Unreal Engine 5 Experience, based on Unreal Engine 5, was released by Epic Games for PlayStation 5 and Xbox Series X/S during The Game Awards 2021.

== Release ==
=== Theatrical and streaming ===
The Matrix Resurrections held its world premiere in the United States at the Castro Theater in San Francisco on December 18, 2021. The film was initially set for release on May 21, 2021, which would have premiered alongside John Wick: Chapter 4, also starring Keanu Reeves. However, the film was postponed to April 1, 2022, due to the COVID-19 pandemic. The film was then moved forward to December 22, 2021. It is the final film from Warner Bros. Pictures to have a simultaneous 30-day release on the HBO Max streaming service, which was used in response to the COVID-19 pandemic.

According to Samba TV, the film was streamed in 2.8 million households over its first five days of release. Over the same period, it received the most unauthorized downloads of any feature, making up 32.6% of torrents. 3.2 million households had streamed it on HBO Max within its first week of release according to Samba TV. The film was released in China on January 14, 2022.

=== Home media ===
The film was released digitally on January 25, 2022, and on Blu-ray, DVD and Ultra HD Blu-ray on March 8. The retail versions includes bonus content including behind-the-scenes featurettes.

== Reception ==
=== Box office ===
The Matrix Resurrections grossed $40.5 million in the United States and Canada, and $118.7 million in other territories for a worldwide total of $159.2 million against a budget of $190 million, making the film a box-office bomb.

In the United States and Canada, the film was released alongside Sing 2 and The King's Man, and was projected to gross around $40 million from 3,552 theaters over its first five days of release, with some tracking reaching as high as $70 million. However, the film ended up underperforming at the box office, grossing $10.75 million over the weekend for a five-day total of $21.2 million, finishing third behind Spider-Man: No Way Home and Sing 2. The total was lower than the $16.7 million made by Warner Bros.' Wonder Woman 1984 the previous Christmas in just 2,151 theaters, and was blamed in part on the simultaneous HBO Max release, lackluster audience reactions, and Christmas falling on a Saturday. In its second weekend, the film finished fifth at the box office with $3.8 million. In its third, the film earned $1.8 million and finished sixth. In its fourth weekend, the film finished tenth at the box office with $803,606.

The film debuted second in Russia ($3.9 million), first in Japan ($3.9 million), and first in Thailand ($794,000). Its opening gross was 8% above Eternals (2021) and 12% over Tenet (2020). The film went on to earn $35.2 million in its second weekend, $13.7 million in its third, and $7.7 million in its fourth. In its fifth weekend, the film crossed the $100 million mark outside the U.S. and Canada. The film made $3.5 million in its sixth weekend, and $2.1 million in its seventh.

In February 2022, co-financiers Village Roadshow sued Warner Bros. for breach of contract, claiming that the decision to stream The Matrix Resurrections on HBO Max created "abysmal theatrical box office sales figures" and damaged the value of the Matrix franchise. Warner Bros. responded that the lawsuit was "a frivolous attempt by Village Roadshow to avoid their contractual commitment".

=== Critical response ===
The review aggregator website Rotten Tomatoes reported an approval rating of 63% based on 356 reviews, with an average rating of 6.2/10. The site's critics consensus reads: "If it lacks the original's bracingly original craft, The Matrix Resurrections revisits the world of the franchise with wit, a timely perspective, and heart." On Metacritic, the film has a weighted average score of 63 out of 100, based on 57 critics, indicating "generally favorable reviews". Audiences polled by CinemaScore gave the film an average grade of "B−" on an A+ to F scale, the lowest of the series, while PostTrak reported 60% of audience members gave it a positive score, with 46% saying they would definitely recommend it.

Los Angeles Times reported divided reactions to the film. Film critic Katie Walsh praised the film, concluding "Wachowski brings this unapologetic earnestness and sense of pleasure to The Matrix Resurrections, which is also a welcome reminder that big action films can be well lit, stunningly designed and, yes, colorful too." The Independent gave the film 4 out of 5 and wrote, "The Matrix Resurrections ends with a literal call to the powers of sentimentality, empowerment and freedom – it ponders whether humanity finds any value in them which, in turn, seems to really ask whether audiences still have any interest in blockbusters of this purity and ambition. For my own stake, at least, I hope they do." Gizmodo praised the film, saying "Resurrections is an excellent Matrix sequel that knows what you think you want in a Matrix sequel, and gives it to you in ways you aren't expecting. Sometimes those things don't work, but mostly they do, and as a result I'm confident to say: The Matrix is back." Matt Singer of ScreenCrush wrote, "The thing that carries The Matrix Resurrections through some of those rough patches instead is Wachowski's obvious affection for the characters, and the actors' reciprocal love for this world and its endless intellectual curiosities."

The Guardian gave the film 2 out of 5 and wrote: "Really, Resurrections doesn't do much to remove the anticlimax that hung like a cloud over the cinema auditorium at the end of the third film in 2003. This movie is set up to initiate a possible new series, but there is no real creative life in it. Where the original film was explosively innovatory, this is just another piece of IP, an algorithm of unoriginality." The Verge also gave the film a negative review praising the performances and visuals but criticized the writing, characterization and recasting of characters and felt that "Resurrection centers Neo and Trinity's love story but in a disjointed and frustrating way." The Times called it "another truly horrible sequel" in a one-star review, criticizing what it called its creative shallowness, similarity to previous Matrix films, level of self-referentiality, and the quality of its action sequences. Gulf News gave the film a mixed review, concluding that "The Matrix Resurrections may be a bumpy ride but it's still a trip." IGN's Amelia Emberwing gave the film 4 out of 10, praising the performances but criticizing the execution and visuals while also writing "The Matrix Resurrections is the kind of film that will go down in cult history because it is so laughably bad. Truthfully, I can't even say it's unenjoyable because I spent so much of its overly long runtime giggling over how jaw-droppingly misguided the majority of it is", and further expressed, "The Matrix Resurrections is a bunch of really good ideas stacked together to make a bad – and sometimes ugly – film."

In June 2025, IndieWire ranked the film at number 49 on its list of "The 100 Best Movies of the 2020s (So Far)."

=== Accolades ===
Award	Date of ceremony	Category	Recipient(s)	Result	Ref.
Critics' Choice Movie Awards	March 13, 2022	Best Visual Effects	The Matrix Resurrections	Nominated	
Hawaii Film Critics Society	January 14, 2022	Worst Film of 2021	The Matrix Resurrections	Nominated	
Houston Film Critics Society	January 19, 2022	Best Stunt Coordination	The Matrix Resurrections	Nominated	
Houston Film Critics Society	January 19, 2022	Best Visual Effects	The Matrix Resurrections	Nominated	
Screen Actors Guild Awards	February 27, 2022	Outstanding Performance by a Stunt Ensemble in a Motion Picture	The Matrix Resurrections	Nominated	
Seattle Film Critics Society	January 17, 2022	Best Visual Effects	Dan Glass, Huw J. Evans, Tom Debenham, and J. D. Schwalm	Nominated	
Set Decorators Society of America Awards	February 22, 2022	Best Achievement in Décor/Design of a Science Fiction or Fantasy Feature Film	Lisa Brennan, Barbara Munch, Hugh Bateup, Peter Walpole	Nominated	
Visual Effects Society	March 8, 2022	Outstanding Visual Effects in a Photoreal Feature	Dan Glass, Nina Fallon, Tom Debenham, Huw J Evans, James Schwalm	Nominated	
Visual Effects Society	March 8, 2022	Outstanding Special (Practical) Effects in a Photoreal or Animated Project	JD Schwalm, Brendon O'Dell, Michael Kay, Pau Costa Moeller	Nominated	
British Academy Film Awards	March 13, 2022	Best Special Visual Effects	Tom Debenham, Huw J. Evans, Dan Glass and J. D. Schwalm	Nominated	

== Future ==
Following the film's release, producer James McTeigue told Collider that there were no plans for further Matrix films, though he believed that the film's open ending meant that this could change in the future: "I think the film also works where it's really open to audience interpretation, like what happened in those 60 years before they fished Neo out again, or Thomas Anderson to Neo. When Neo and Trinity are there at the end, and they're talking with The Analyst, what do they actually mean that they're going to change? So I think that it's out there, but it's not in our wheelhouse at the moment."

In April 2024, it was announced that Warner Bros. was developing a new installment in the franchise with Drew Goddard attached to write and direct. Lana Wachowski will serve as executive producer.

In November 2026, Puck reported that the Wachowskis were attempting to reclaim the Matrix rights from Warner Bros., which could revert to them as early as 2029.
