= Carrie-Anne Moss =

Canadian actress (born 1967)

- Moss in 2026
- Born: August 21, 1967 (age 59); Burnaby, British Columbia, Canada
- Citizenship: Canada
- Occupation: Actress
- Years active: 1989–present
- Spouse: Steven Roy (m. 1999)
- Children: 3

Carrie-Anne Moss (born August 21, 1967) is a Canadian actress. After early roles on television, she rose to international prominence for her role of Trinity in The Matrix series (1999–present). She has starred in Memento (2000), for which she won the Independent Spirit Award for Best Supporting Female, Red Planet (2000), Chocolat (2000), Fido (2006), Snow Cake (2006), for which she won the Genie Award for Best Performance by an Actress in a Supporting Role, Disturbia (2007), Unthinkable (2010), Silent Hill: Revelation (2012), Pompeii (2014), and Die Alone (2024), for which she was nominated for the Canadian Screen Award for Best Lead Performance in a Drama Film. She also portrayed Jeri Hogarth in several television series produced by Marvel Television for Netflix, most notably Jessica Jones (2015–2019).

== Early life ==
Moss was born on August 21, 1967, in Burnaby, British Columbia, a suburb of Vancouver. She is the daughter of Barbara and Melvyn Moss. She has an older brother, Brooke. Moss's mother reportedly named her after the Hollies' 1967 hit song, "Carrie Anne", which had been released in May of that year. Moss lived with her mother in Vancouver as a child. At the age of 11, she joined the Vancouver children's musical theatre and later went on to tour Europe with the Magee Secondary School Choir in her senior year.

== Career ==
=== 1990s and breakthrough ===
While living in Spain, Moss obtained a role as Tara, the clerk to Judge Nicholas Marshall in the drama series Dark Justice, her first television appearance. She moved from Barcelona to Los Angeles with the series in 1992. Moss left Dark Justice before the series' third and final season and was replaced by Elisa Heinsohn as Samantha "Sam" Collins. She enrolled at the American Academy of Dramatic Arts in Pasadena upon her return, and she subsequently starred in Fox's primetime soap opera Models Inc., a spin-off of Melrose Place, as a model. The series was cancelled in July 1995. She headlined a short-lived made-in-Canada series titled Matrix. For most of the 1990s, she appeared in several television series such as Street Justice, Baywatch, F/X: The Series, and Due South, for which she scored a nomination for the Gemini Award for Best Guest Actress in a Drama. Many of her film roles in the decade were in B movies, including Flashfire (1994), The Soft Kill (1994), Tough Guy (1994), Lethal Tender (1996), Sabotage (1996), and The Secret Life of Algernon (1997).

Her breakthrough role came when she played Trinity in the science-fiction thriller The Matrix (1999). Her role demanded extreme acrobatic actions, and she underwent a three-hour physical test during casting. The film grossed over US$460 million worldwide and was highly acclaimed by critics, some of whom have considered it one of the greatest science-fiction films ever made. Moss asserted that prior to being cast in The Matrix, she had "no career". It launched Moss into international recognition and transformed her career; in a New York Daily News interview, she stated, "The Matrix gave me so many opportunities. Everything I've done since then has been because of that experience. It gave me so much." Moss was nominated for a Saturn Award for Best Actress, and for the MTV Movie Award for Breakthrough Female Performance.

=== 2000s ===
Moss had four film releases in 2000—Chocolat, Red Planet, The Crew, and Memento. In the romantic comedy Chocolat, she took on the role of Caroline Clairmont, a cold, devoutly pious woman living in a French village. As part of an overall positive response towards the film, The New York Times remarked that Moss, "as an upright widowed mother swathed in mournful baby blue, radiates glimmers of hurt; she shows it's not easy to keep up such a front." The film made US$152 million at the international box office. The science-fiction thriller Red Planet had her play the commander and leader of a rescue mission to Mars. A.V. Club felt that Moss was "largely reduced to worrying while modelling a series of tight-fitting space fashions". Despite a US$80 million budget, the film only grossed US$33 million worldwide. She appeared as detective Olivia Neal in the crime black comedy The Crew, directed by Michael Dinner.

In Christopher Nolan's neo-noir psychological thriller Memento, she portrayed a manipulative bartender who meets a man suffering from anterograde amnesia. Producer Jennifer Todd suggested Moss for the part after being impressed by her performance in The Matrix. Nolan decided to cast Moss as Natalie, saying, "She added an enormous amount to the role of Natalie that wasn't on the page". The film became a sleeper hit, being acclaimed by critics and earning US$39.7 million over a US$9 million budget. She won the Independent Spirit Award for Best Supporting Female for her performance.

Moss reprised the role of Trinity in the back-to-back sequels The Matrix Reloaded and The Matrix Revolutions, both released in 2003. Like the original, The Matrix Reloaded received positive critical reception, and became a major box office hit, grossing US$742.1 million worldwide. The Matrix Revolutions received a lukewarm critical reception, but made US$427.3 million globally. During an interview with BBC Online, Moss expressed her pride for starring in the franchise, which she described as a "segment of [her] life": "It's deep and it's beautiful to have been part of it for so long. It's pretty spectacular". She provided voiceovers for video game and animated spin-offs of the films.

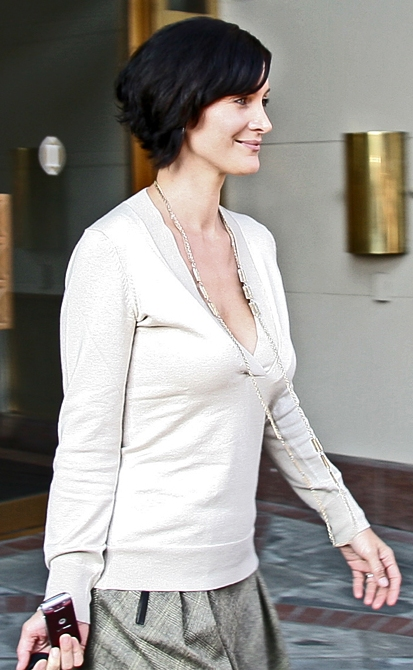
Moss at the 2007 Toronto International Film Festival

In 2005, Moss starred in the little-seen thriller Suspect Zero as FBI agent Fran Kulok, and was part of an ensemble cast in the independent dramedy The Chumscrubber, which premiered at the Sundance Film Festival. Moss next appeared in the zombie comedy Fido (2006), playing a housewife in a 1950s-esque alternate universe where radiation from space has turned the dead into zombies. She noted the "very rich" and "very visual" script for the film, and became drawn to the project for its "underlying messages about control and domination". Fido was an opening night film at the Toronto International Film Festival, and received largely favourable reviews, with the Los Angeles Times calling it a "crafty mixture of George A. Romero and Douglas Sirk." Moss played the neighbour of an autistic woman in the small-scale romantic drama Snow Cake (2006). It was released in selected theatres, to positive reviews from critics. Moss earned a nomination for Genie Award for Best Performance by an Actress in a Supporting Role.

In the Hitchcockian thriller Disturbia (2007), Moss portrayed the mother of a troubled teenager who suspects one of his neighbours is a serial killer. The film was met with a positive critical reception and made US$117.8 million around the globe. She played one of the people who are brought together in the wake of a deadly car accident in the independent drama Normal (2007), released for selected theatres. Moss appeared in the drama Fireflies in the Garden, which revolved around the inner lives and affairs of a family. The production premiered at the 2008 Berlin International Film Festival and was released theatrically in the United States in October 2011. She starred in the straight-to-DVD romantic comedy Love Hurts (2009).

=== 2010s ===
In the thriller Unthinkable (2010), directed by Gregor Jordan, Moss played the leader of an FBI counter-terrorism team assigned to interrogate a man who threatens to detonate three nuclear bombs in the United States. The film was released direct-to-DVD and generated controversy over its subject matter. She took on the role of antagonist Claudia Wolf in the sequel to the 2006 horror film Silent Hill, Silent Hill: Revelation (2012). Budgeted at US$20 million, the film grossed US$52.3 million worldwide, but garnered an overwhelmingly negative reception among film critics and fans alike. Mentioning Moss in its review for the film, The New York Times remarked that the supporting actors "deserve much, much better". She voiced the character Aria T'Loak in the video games Mass Effect 2 (2010) and Mass Effect 3 (2012).

She had a four-episode arc in the series Chuck between 2011 and 2012, and played the regular role of Las Vegas Assistant District Attorney Katherine O'Connell in the CBS period drama series Vegas, which premiered in September 2012, but was cancelled after its first season, despite an overall positive response. Writing for The New York Times, Mike Hale felt that Moss "feels out of place in this frontier tale, but looks great in snug wool suits". Moss obtained the role of Penelope, a California candidate for governor who runs a free health clinic, in the political thriller Knife Fight (2012), directed by Bill Guttentag. The film premiered at the Tribeca Film Festival and was released for a two-theater run and digital platforms. Moss headlined the psychological dark comedy Compulsion (2013), in which she played one of two people occupying neighbouring apartments, each one grappling with psychological disorders that begin to overtake their lives. The film opened for limited release. She voiced the character of Admiral Wells in the fantasy animated film The Clockwork Girl (2014).

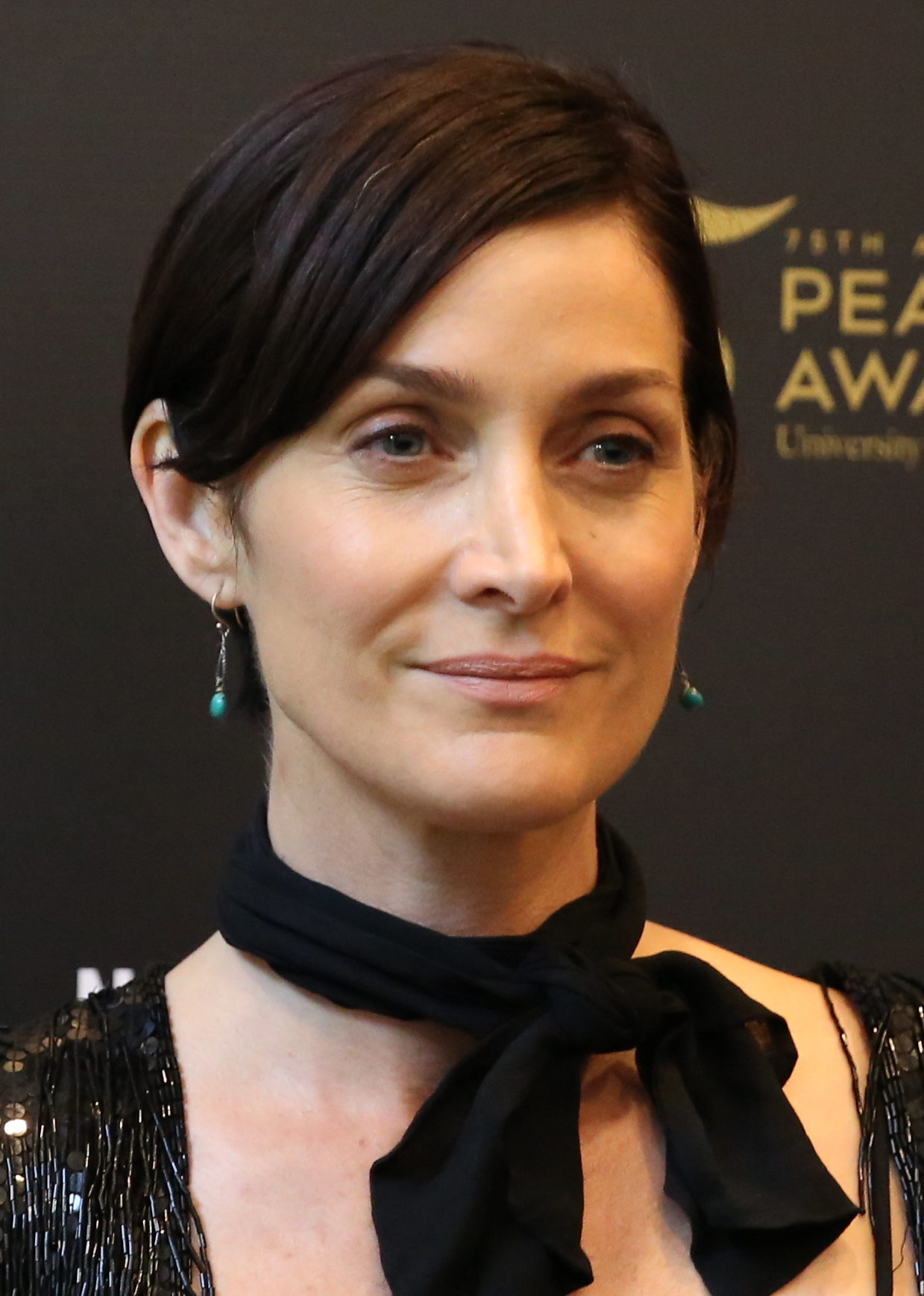
Moss in 2016

She starred in the 3D historical disaster picture Pompeii (2014), produced and directed by Paul W. S. Anderson. The film, inspired by the eruption of Mount Vesuvius in 79 that destroyed the Roman Empire city Pompeii, had her portray Aurelia, the wife of the city governor. In the independent drama Elephant Song (2014), directed by Charles Binamé, Moss starred as the wife of a psychiatrist. The film was screened at the Toronto International Film Festival, and in its review for the film, Variety described her role as "a pushily self-centered second wife" and found her part to be "a poorly integrated subplot" in the film. In 2015, she voiced a widowed mother in the made-for-television animated film Pirate's Passage, was one of the narrators in the documentary Unity, and appeared as the wife of Victor Frankenstein in Frankenstein, an updated adaptation of Mary Shelley's book.

In 2015, Moss appeared in Jessica Jones as Jeri Hogarth, an attorney and potentially powerful ally to the title character. The gender of the character was changed from male to female for the series, and the character was written as a lesbian. Moss signed on to the series after reading the first two scripts, having been pitched the character by producer Jeph Loeb and screenwriter Melissa Rosenberg. She described the character by saying, "she's fierce, she's strong, she's powerful, and she likes that power". The web series premiered on Netflix, to critical acclaim. Moss has also reprised her role of Jeri Hogarth in the second-season finale of Daredevil, and has had recurring arcs in Iron Fist and The Defenders. Moss took on the lead role of Dr. Athena Morrow, an AI researcher invited to reverse engineer a consciousness program, in the second season of the science-fiction series Humans. Moss filmed a supporting part in the supernatural horror film The Bye Bye Man (2017), playing what Variety described as "the world's most soft-edged hard-bitten police detective". Despite negative reviews, the film grossed US$24 million worldwide on a budget of US$7 million.

=== 2020s ===
Moss returned to the Matrix film series in the 2021 film The Matrix Resurrections, in which Moss reprises her role as Trinity. The film was released on December 22, 2021, in theaters and on HBO Max. The film overall received mixed reviews from critics, yet Moss's performance as Trinity was again praised. Moss welcomed her return to the role, stating, "Who am I if not Trinity?"

== Personal life ==
Moss married Canadian actor Steven Roy in 1999, and they have two sons Owen and Kaden (b. 2003 and 2005) and a daughter Frances Beatrice (b. 2009). As of 2020, they live in New Hampshire. She is the founder of Annapurna Living, a lifestyle brand designed to empower women through mindfulness, meditation, and devotion. Moss stresses that her spiritual practice has been instrumental in navigating the "rejection" and stresses in the Hollywood movie business.

== Filmography ==
=== Film ===
Year	Title	Role	Notes
1994	The Soft Kill	Jane Tanner	
1994	Flashfire	Meredith Neal	
1995	Terrified	Tracy	Also known as Evil Never Sleeps
1996	Sabotage	Louise Castle	
1997	Lethal Tender	Melissa Wilkins	
1997	The Secret Life of Algernon	Madge Clerisy	
1999	New Blood	Leigh	
1999	The Matrix	Trinity	
2000	Chocolat	Caroline Clairmont	
2000	Red Planet	Kate Bowman	
2000	The Crew	Olivia Neal	
2000	Memento	Natalie	
2003	The Matrix Reloaded	Trinity	
2003	The Animatrix	Trinity	Voice only
2003	The Matrix Revolutions	Trinity	
2004	Suspect Zero	Fran Kulok	
2005	The Chumscrubber	Jerri Falls	
2005	Confessions of an Action Star	Herself / Girlfriend in movie	
2006	Fido	Helen Robinson	
2006	Snow Cake	Maggie	
2006	Mini's First Time	Diane Drogues-Tennan	
2007	Disturbia	Julie Brecht	
2007	Normal	Catherine	
2008	Fireflies in the Garden	Kelly Hanson	
2009	Love Hurts	Amanda Bingham	
2010	Unthinkable	Helen Brody	
2012	Silent Hill: Revelation	Claudia Wolf	
2012	Knife Fight	Penelope Nelson	
2013	The Clockwork Girl	Admiral Wells (voice)	
2013	Treading Water	Psychiatrist	
2013	Compulsion	Saffron	
2014	Dragon Nest: Warriors' Dawn	Elena (voice)	
2014	Pompeii	Aurelia	
2014	Elephant Song	Olivia	
2015	Pirate's Passage	Kerstin Hawkins (voice)	
2015	Unity	Narrator	Documentary
2015	Frankenstein	Elizabeth Frankenstein	
2016	Brain on Fire	Rhona Nack	
2017	The Bye Bye Man	Detective Shaw	
2021	The Matrix Resurrections	Trinity	
2024	Accidental Texan	Faye	
2024	Die Alone	Mae	

=== Television ===
Year	Title	Role	Notes
1991–1993	Dark Justice	Tara McDonald	9 episodes
1991	Street Justice	Jennifer	2 episodes
1992	Forever Knight	Monica Howard	Episode: "Feeding the Beast"
1992	Down the Shore	Nancy	Episode: "Atlantic City"
1993	Matrix	Liz Teel	13 episodes
1993	Doorways	Laura	Unaired TV pilot
1993	Silk Stalkings	Lisa / Lana Bannon	Episode: "The Perfect Alibi"
1994–1995	Models Inc.	Carrie Spencer	29 episodes
1994	Baywatch	Gwen Brown / Mattie Brown	Episode: "Mirror, Mirror"
1995	Nowhere Man	Karin Stoltz	Episode: "Something About Her"
1996–1997	F/X: The Series	Lucinda Scott	22 episodes (Season 1)
1996	Due South	Irene Zuko	Episode: "Juliet is Bleeding"
1997	Viper	Stacy Taylor	Episode: "Triple Cross"
2007	Suspect	Lt. Chivers	TV pilot
2008	Pretty/Handsome	Elizabeth Fitzpayne	TV pilot
2011	Normal	Ann Brown	TV pilot
2011–2012	Chuck	Gertrude Verbanski	4 episodes (Season 5)
2012–2013	Vegas	Katherine O'Connell	21 episodes
2014	Crossing Lines	Amanda Andrews	4 episodes (Season 2)
2015–2019	Jessica Jones	Jeri Hogarth	34 episodes
2016	Daredevil	Jeri Hogarth	Episode: "A Cold Day in Hell's Kitchen"
2016	Humans	Athena Morrow	8 episodes (Season 2)
2016	Man Seeking Woman	Joan Dillon	Episode: "Eel"
2017	Iron Fist	Jeri Hogarth	3 episodes (Season 1)
2017	The Defenders	Jeri Hogarth	Episode: "Mean Right Hook"
2019–2022	Wisting	Maggie Griffin	11 episodes
2019–2020	Tell Me a Story	Rebecca Pruitt	10 episodes (Season 2)
2024	The Acolyte	Indara	3 episodes
2025	FUBAR	Greta Nelso	8 episodes (Season 2)
2026	Yaga	Katherine Yazov	Upcoming series

=== Video games ===
Year	Title	Voice role	Notes
2003	Enter the Matrix	Trinity	FMV; Motion capture
2010	Mass Effect 2	Aria T'Loak	
2012	Mass Effect 3	Aria T'Loak	Also appears in Omega
2021	Mass Effect: Legendary Edition	Aria T'Loak	Archive audio
2021	The Matrix Awakens	Herself / Trinity	Voice and motion capture, tie-in tech demo for The Matrix Resurrections
2022	Horizon Forbidden West	Tilda	Voice and motion capture

== Awards and nominations ==
Year	Nominated work	Award	Result	Ref.
1997	Due South	Gemini Award for Best Guest Actress in a Drama	Nominated	
1999	The Matrix	Empire Award for Best Newcomer (tied with Damien O'Donnell)	Won	
1999	The Matrix	MTV Movie Award for Breakthrough Female Performance	Nominated	
1999	The Matrix	Saturn Award for Best Actress	Nominated	
1999	The Matrix	Blockbuster Entertainment Award for Favorite Actress - Newcomer	Nominated	
2000	Chocolat	Screen Actors Guild Award for Outstanding Performance by a Cast in a Motion Picture	Nominated	
2000	Memento	Independent Spirit Award for Best Supporting Female	Won	
2000	Memento	Las Vegas Film Critics Society Award for Best Supporting Actress	Nominated	
2000	Memento	Chlotrudis Award for Best Supporting Actress	Nominated	
2000	Memento	Golden Schmoes Award for Best Supporting Actress	Nominated	
2003	The Matrix Revolutions	Teen Choice Award for Choice Movie Actress – Drama/Action Adventure	Nominated	
2006	Fido	Vancouver Film Critics Circle Award for Best Actress in a Canadian Film	Won	
2006	Snow Cake	Genie Award for Best Performance by an Actress in a Supporting Role	Won	
2024	Die Alone	Canadian Screen Award for Best Lead Performance in a Drama Film	Nominated	
