= Enter the Matrix =

2003 video game

- North American cover art
- Developer: Shiny Entertainment
- Publisher: Infogrames (Note: Released under the Atari brand name)
- Director: The Wachowskis
- Producers: Joel Silver; Rosanna Sun
- Writer: The Wachowskis
- Composers: Don Davis; Erik Lundborg
- Series: The Matrix
- Platforms: GameCube, PlayStation 2, Windows, Xbox
- Release: May 15, 2003
- Genre: Action-adventure
- Modes: Single-player, multiplayer

Enter the Matrix is a 2003 action-adventure video game developed by Shiny Entertainment and published by Infogrames under the Atari brand name. The first game based on The Matrix film series, its story is concurrent with that of the film The Matrix Reloaded and features over an hour of original footage, written and directed by the Wachowskis and starring the cast of the films, produced for the game.

Released on May 15, 2003, around the same period as The Matrix Reloaded, Enter the Matrix was simultaneously produced with The Matrix Reloaded and The Matrix Revolutions. While it received mixed reviews from critics, the game sold 5 million copies as of May 2004.

== Gameplay ==
Enter the Matrix gives players control of two of the supporting characters from Reloaded and Revolutions, Ghost (Anthony Wong) and Niobe (Jada Pinkett Smith), members of the same group of rebels as Morpheus, Trinity, and Neo, the protagonists of the series. Niobe is the Captain of the Logos, the fastest ship in the rebel fleet. Ghost is the ship's first mate, weapons guru, and a deep-thinking, philosophical assassin. The game takes place at roughly the same time as the events in Reloaded.

Players play as either Niobe or Ghost, each of whom have slight variations during their story. Most levels involve controlling players in a third-person perspective, using guns and fighting skills to defeat opponents and complete level objectives. At any time, players can activate bullet time (called "Focus" in the game) which slows down time, giving players the ability to perform actions such as shooting in midair and dodging bullets. Some levels involve one-on-one martial arts fighting against single opponents. In levels involving vehicles, such as driving a car or piloting the Logos, the style of game play depends on the selected player, commonly with Niobe maneuvering the vehicles to avoid obstacles, whilst Ghost takes control of a gun to fight off incoming enemies. A hacking system allows players to enter codes, which can unlock special skills, weapons and secrets, such as a 2-player versus mode.

== Plot ==
The story begins with Niobe, captain of the Logos, and Ghost, her first mate, retrieving a package left in the Matrix by the crew of the recently destroyed rebel ship Osiris. After being pursued by Agents, Ghost and Niobe escape from the Matrix with the package, which turns out to be a message to the human city Zion, warning them that the machines are approaching with an army of at least 250,000 Sentinels. Niobe and Ghost are tasked with calling the rest of the ships back to Zion to coordinate a defense.

With this in mind, the captains of the various ships hold a meeting in the Matrix to decide on how best to defend themselves. During the meeting, Agents attack the building they are in, although Niobe and Ghost are able to help their allies escape. They then encounter the Keymaker, a program capable of accessing any area in the Matrix, who leads them to safety through a door he created. The Keymaker gives the two a key that they are supposed to give to Neo. However, the key is stolen by henchmen of the Merovingian, a program created during the early days of the Matrix who now operates an illegal smuggling ring within the program. Ultimately, the Merovingian destroys the key, but Niobe and Ghost are able to escape, when the Keymaker realizes that it is too early for the key to be given to Neo.

Niobe later volunteers to go find the Nebuchadnezzar, the ship captained by Morpheus, upon which Neo serves, and the only ship yet to return to Zion. Upon finding the ship and its crew, and helping them escape from the Matrix, Niobe and Ghost agree to help in Neo's mission against the machines, agreeing to destroy a power plant. After this mission is completed, the Oracle, a program that often gives the humans advice, requests that the player character come and speak to her. After their conversation, the player is confronted by Smith, a rogue Agent that seeks to destroy both the human and machine worlds. The player character barely escapes from the hundreds of Smith copies and the Matrix. Once out, the Logos is attacked by the machines. They defeat the machines by setting off an EMP, which disables their own ship in the process. As the game ends, Niobe and Ghost wait in the Logos, hoping that they will be rescued. The two wonder what's coming but believe that it will be "a hell of a ride."

=== Characters ===
Aside from Ghost and Niobe, there are numerous secondary characters in Enter The Matrix.

- Sparks (Lachy Hulme) — the operator on the Logos; he gives players tips and information throughout the game.
- Vector (Don Anjaya Battee) — The first mate of the Vigilant. When Axel was kidnapped by agents, Vector helps Soren get him back. Niobe found herself surrounded by police but is saved by Vector. Trapped in the fire on the Vigilant.
- Smith — a former program, now virus, that can absorb human bodies and humanoid programs to make copies of himself; he chases the player through an abandoned skyscraper, and later, Chinatown.
- Agent Johnson — an agent who appears frequently during the game; Niobe defeats him by kicking him off a cargo plane, while Ghost defeats him by knocking him into a short-circuited computer server.
- Agent Jackson — another agent with frequent appearances in the game; Ghost defeats him by blowing up his helicopter. Jackson also tries to kill Niobe and Ghost after the crew of the Caduceus is saved, but the two were unexpectedly saved by the Keymaker.
- Agent Thompson — the least-featured Agent in the game, who only appears in cinematics; the only opportunity to fight him occurs at the end of Niobe's missions at the power plant.
- The Oracle — a program within the Matrix who often helps the humans.
- Seraph — a martial arts master who protects the Oracle; he fights Niobe or Ghost once during the events of the game.
- Morpheus — a member of the rebels, Niobe's ex-boyfriend, and captain of the Nebuchadnezzar.
- Trinity — another rebel, a good friend of Ghost, to whom she refers as "dear brother"; he in turn refers to her as "dear sister"; first mate on the Nebuchadnezzar.
- Neo — the most important rebel; Morpheus believes he is "The One".
- Cmdr. Lock — leader of the Zion defence forces; Niobe's current boyfriend.
- Axel, Soren, Ballard, Bane, Binary, Ice, Corrupt and Malachi — rebels encountered during the game.
- The Keymaker — an old program who guides players through certain portions of the game.
- The Trainman — carries multiple wristwatches on his arms; he controls the link between the Matrix and the machine city, and works for the Merovingian.
- The Merovingian — an old program that has gone rogue in the Matrix; he has a chateau in the mountains wherein he has the Keymaker imprisoned; his henchmen are from early Matrix programs, and are rumored to be "vampires" and "werewolves".
- Persephone — wife of the Merovingian; often betrays him out of spite.
- Cain and Abel — two henchmen of the Merovingian.
- Vlad — the black-clad, pale-skinned leader of the Merovingian's vampires; he is killed by Niobe, who stabs him through the heart with a wooden stake.
- Cujo — the leader of the Merovingian's werewolves; he is killed by being impaled on a wooden stake in the dungeons of the chateau.
- The Twins — employees of the Merovingian, they are encountered as the player leaves the chateau; they chase the players down a long tunnel, before they are finally evaded.
- Sewing Woman — a character featured in the multiplayer mode of the game.

== Connections to the films ==
Enter the Matrix was designed, like the 2003 animated film The Animatrix, to be an integral part of the Matrix milieu. The game includes one hour of live action 35 mm film footage written and directed specifically for the game by The Wachowskis. The martial arts moves and game engine cutscenes feature actions motion captured directly from the films' actors and stunt doubles to recreate their unique fighting style, and were created under the supervision of the series' fight scene choreographer Yuen Woo-ping.

The player learns that Neo is not the only target of Persephone's predilection for trading kisses for esoteric information; Niobe and Ghost are both put into positions where they must submit to her whims in order to gain critical information. Significant also to the continuity of the Matrix universe is the first appearance of actress Mary Alice in the role of the Oracle. Gloria Foster, the original actress, had died of complications related to diabetes early in the production of The Matrix Reloaded and The Matrix Revolutions. She had filmed her scenes for Reloaded, but was yet to complete her work on Revolutions. The game includes a sequence specifically explaining her change of appearance, as a result of an attack on her by the Merovingian. The Merovingian's attack was facilitated by a sacrificial trade with the compassionate program Rama-Kandra. The Merovingian acquired the deletion codes for the Oracle's external "shell", and in exchange, he gave Rama-Kandra's daughter, Sati, her freedom, despite her lack of purpose in the machine world. The Oracle foretells, however, that Sati will play an important role in both the Matrix and the real world.

== Development ==
Plans for a Matrix video game began surfacing in November 1999, following the film's release. The Wachowskis had talks with Shiny Entertainment and Konami to develop the title around this time. At E3 2000, the title was officially announced, with Shiny Entertainment as the developer and their then-owner Interplay Entertainment as the publisher. The game would be based on the then-untitled second movie and would be released for the PlayStation 2 in 2002, the same year the sequel was due to release.

On May 1, 2001, Interplay announced that the game would also be released for the Xbox, with Microsoft paying $5 million to secure a six-month exclusivity deal to release the title on the Xbox before any other console, supply exclusive content for the version, and also securing exclusive online gaming rights to the franchise, however, Interplay would remain as publisher.

Due to financial difficulties, Interplay sold Shiny to Infogrames in April 2002 for $47 million, with the Matrix license transferring over. With the delay of the now-named The Matrix Reloaded, the game was now scheduled for a May 2003 release. At E3 2002, the title for the game was officially announced as Enter the Matrix, and would be released for the PlayStation 2, Xbox, GameCube and Microsoft Windows simultaneously. In March 2003, the game was announced to be released on May 15, the same day as The Matrix Reloaded. It was also shown off at E3 2003 at the now-named Atari's booth, within the release of the title.

Overall, Enter the Matrix took two and a half years to produce on a budget of $20 million, not including marketing expenses or the cost of the extra hour of movie footage. Keanu Reeves was said to have made $2.5 million for his voice work on the game.

In March 2004, with the success of the title, Atari announced that the game would be re-released in Europe under Sony's Platinum, Nintendo's Player's Choice and Microsoft's Xbox Classics ranges at a new lower price, while the PC version would be re-released as well under Atari's own "Best of Atari" label. The budget PS2 and PC versions were newer versions, which include bonus minigames not found on the original releases.

== Soundtrack ==
Enter the Matrix: Original Soundtrack from the Videogame

Soundtrack album by Erik Lundborg
- Released: 2003
- Length: 46:46

A promotional CD release of the soundtrack accompanied the video game, with compositions by Erik Lundborg in the style of Don Davis, who composed the music for the films.

=== Track listing ===
1. "Kick Jab Stab" (3:04)
2. "Get Out Of My Face" (3:18)
3. "In My Path... You're Dead" (2:22)
4. "Eat This, Jerk" (3:27)
5. "You Don't Scare Me Bucko" (2:35)
6. "I Do Not Like You" (1:57)
7. "Fist Fight" (2:29)
8. "Smelly Sewer" (1:27)
9. "Be Prepared" (1:41)
10. "A Sickening Feeling" (4:22)
11. "Somethin's Wrong" (3:10)
12. "Uh, Oh... What's That?" (3:04)
13. "Stuck In Much – Escape" (1:23)
14. "What Fresh Hell Is This?" (2:11)
15. "Not Agent Smith – Again!!!" (2:53)
16. "Zen Garden" (1:21)
17. "The Big Distraction" (0:50)
18. "Elevator Is a Trap" (0:36)
19. "Tear Gas" (0:42)
20. "Piano Escape" (0:25)
21. "Swat to Phone" (0:33)
22. "No Rest for the Wicked" (0:47)
23. "Merovingian's Office" (0:37)
24. "Attic Opens" (0:27)
25. "Going to Church" (0:52)

Other musical groups, such as Evanescence, Fluke, Clawfinger, and Celldweller, are featured in the game and are credited in the game's booklet.

== Sales ==
Within a week of release, Atari announced that the game had sold 1 million units for all four platforms in North America and Europe combined. By June, the game sold 2.5 million units and became the company's fastest-selling title in history. Within March 2004, the title sold 5 million units, and was reissued under the console's budget labels around this time. By July 2006, the PlayStation 2 version of Enter the Matrix had sold 1.2 million copies and earned $58 million in the United States. Next Generation ranked it as the 39th highest-selling game launched for the PlayStation 2, Xbox or GameCube between January 2000 and July 2006 in that country. Combined sales of Enter the Matrix console releases reached 1.9 million units in the United States by July 2006. Worldwide, the game sold 5 million units.

== Reception ==
Reception

Aggregate score
Aggregator	Score			
Aggregator	GameCube	PC	PS2	Xbox
Metacritic	63/100	58/100	62/100	65/100

Review scores
Publication	Score			
Publication	GameCube	PC	PS2	Xbox
AllGame	N/A	N/A	2.5/5	N/A
Edge	N/A	N/A	3/10	N/A
Electronic Gaming Monthly	4.33/10	N/A	4.33/10	4.33/10
Eurogamer	N/A	N/A	4/10	N/A
Game Informer	8.5/10	N/A	8.5/10	8.5/10
GamePro	3/5	2.5/5	3/5	2.5/5
GameRevolution	C−	N/A	C−	C−
GameSpot	6.4/10	6.3/10	6.4/10	6.4/10
GameSpy	2/5	2/5	2/5	2/5
IGN	7.2/10	6.6/10	7.2/10	7.2/10
Nintendo Power	4.1/5	N/A	N/A	N/A
Official U.S. PlayStation Magazine	N/A	N/A	3/5	N/A
Official Xbox Magazine (US)	N/A	N/A	N/A	6.2/10
PC Gamer (US)	N/A	55%	N/A	N/A
The Cincinnati Enquirer	3.5/5	3.5/5	3.5/5	3.5/5
Entertainment Weekly	B	B	B	B

Enter the Matrix received "mixed or average" reviews according to video game review aggregator website Metacritic.

Two critics from Electronic Gaming Monthly gave it "bad" scores; another later admitted that his "average" score for the game was more positive than the game actually deserved. Mark MacDonald was especially scathing, writing "In more than 20 years of playing games, I have never seen a console game as obviously unfinished and rushed to market as Enter the Matrix. ... This game is a complete mess, and that's the only thing complete about it."

GameSpot listed Enter the Matrix in several of their "Dubious Honors" lists at the end of 2003, including their five most disappointing titles of the year. One common complaint was that players wanted to play as trilogy protagonist Neo rather than secondary characters Ghost and Niobe, an issue Shiny Entertainment addressed with their later Matrix game Path of Neo.

Steven Poole, in his column in Edge, described the PS2 version of Enter the Matrix as "Max Payne with celebrity scriptwriters", and said that the films' fluid fight choreography could not be matched by the game's control system, and that the game's centred view, while practical, was not as interesting as the "kinetic montage" of camera angles used in the movies' action scenes.

Positive comments came from IGN, Game Informer, and Nintendo Power, with NP stating, "its game play suffers from repetition, but this two-disc technomelange has tons of great stuff for Matrix fans." IGN's review, while mixed, praised its presentation and sound, stating that "you can't get much better than having the Wachowskis filming your cutscenes," and "Kudos to the sound team for bringing the movie audio to life in the game. Excellent sound design, and a great score." The IGN review also said, "Things could have been much better with a few more months in development. That said, the story elements and the way the [Wachowskis] tie together the Matrix movies, the Animatrix shorts, and the game is exceptional. Not being able to slip into the black robes of the movie's principal characters is a bummer, but there's no denying that playing through Enter the Matrix will actually increase your appreciation of the Matrix universe as a whole." They also praised the GameCube version, specifically: "A big 'thank you' to Atari and Shiny for making sure that Nintendo's little cube didn't get shafted. The GameCube version actually ships on two disks to accommodate all the video and audio content. DPLII, progressive scan, DIVX compression — it's all used to full effect to make sure the GameCube version is as good as it can be."

Even non-video game publications gave the game some positive acclaim. Maxim gave it a score of eight out of ten and said it was "by no means a weak attempt to cash in on a franchise...Gamers not only get tons of extra movie action but also get to run, kick, and shoot in a fully realized Matrix universe." Entertainment Weekly gave it a B and said that it "wants to be so many different games that it doesn't excel at any one of them." The Cincinnati Enquirer gave it three-and-a-half stars out of five and said that the game "isn't a perfect slice of interactive entertainment, but it does provide at least a dozen hours of action-packed fun and serves as a clever vehicle to expand on the events in The Matrix Reloaded." The Village Voice, however, gave it six out of ten and stated: "Nerds may activate two-player mode using the DOS-throwback 'hacking gameplay element.' If any of you figure out how to boff Trinity during a rave, please e-mail me."

By July 2005, the game sold nearly 6 million copies.

== Awards ==
At the AIAS' 7th Annual Interactive Achievement Awards, Jada Pinkett Smith's performance as Niobe won the award for "Outstanding Achievement in Character Performance - Female", tying with Tara Strong's vocal performance as Rikku in Final Fantasy X-2. It won for Best Game Based on a Movie or TV Show at the 2003 VGX Awards.
