= The Secret Life of Algernon =

- Directed by: Charles Jarrott
- Written by: John Cullum; John Gray; Charles Jarrott
- Produced by: Nancy Marano
- Starring: John Cullum; Carrie-Anne Moss; Charles Durning
- Cinematography: Gregory Middleton
- Edited by: Doug Forbes
- Music by: Graeme Coleman
- Production companies: Marano Productions; Phare-Est Productions
- Release date: 1997
- Running time: 106 minutes
- Country: Canada
- Language: English

The Secret Life of Algernon is a 1997 Canadian comedy film directed by Charles Jarrott. It stars John Cullum and Carrie-Anne Moss in an early film appearance. It won an award at the 1998 Breckenridge Festival of Film. The film is based on the novel by Russell H. Greenan The Secret Life of Algernon Pendleton.

== Plot ==
Algernon is an old man who lives alone, having conversations with a porcelain cat and making things out of bones, for which he boils a neighbor's dead dog. He is visited by an old friend who is dying of ailments and thus commits suicide, leaving a million dollars in a suitcase. A woman claiming to be interested in Algernon's Egyptologist great-grandfather pretends to be in love with Algernon, and he almost falls for it.

== Cast ==
- John Cullum as Algernon Pendelton
- Carrie-Anne Moss as Madge Clarisy
- Charles Durning as Norbie Hess
- Hrant Alianak as Mahir Sullyman
- Kay Hawtrey as Mrs. Binney

== Production ==
Filming took place throughout New Brunswick, including the cities of Moncton and Saint John, with parts also being shot in the village of Riverside-Albert in Albert County.
