= Matrix (TV series) =

- Genre: Fantasy
- Created by: Coleman Luck
- Written by: Coleman Luck; Gail Morgan Hickman; Rob Gilmer; George Geiger
- Directed by: Jorge Montesi; Allan Eastman; Eleanor Lindo; Alan Simmonds
- Starring: Nick Mancuso; Phillip Jarrett; Carrie-Anne Moss
- Narrated by: John Vernon
- Country of origin: Canada
- Original language: English
- No. of seasons: 1
- No. of episodes: 13

Production
- Executive producers: Steve Levitan; Paul Saltzman
- Producers: Rob Gilmer; George Geiger
- Cinematography: Manfred Guthe
- Running time: 60 min.

Original release
- Network: CTV Television Network
- Release: March 1 – July 22, 1993

Matrix is a Canadian fantasy adventure series that ran for 13 episodes in 1993. The series was broadcast by CTV in Canada, and the USA Network in the United States. The series was rebroadcast in 2000.

== Synopsis ==
The series starred Nick Mancuso as Steven Matrix, a hitman who is killed during a job and sent to a version of Purgatory called The City In-Between. There he is given a choice: to be sent to Hell for all the murders he's committed, or return to Earth and help people. Once alive again, Matrix receives periodic assignments from The City In-Between.

== Cast ==
- Phillip Jarrett – Billy Hicks
- Carrie-Anne Moss – Liz Teel
- John Vernon – Narrator

== Production ==
The central premise of this series may be derived from "Sea of Fire", an episode of the TV series The Equalizer. In that episode, Robert McCall (Edward Woodward's character) attempts to scare a street gang into going straight by taking them to a morgue. There, McCall introduces the gang to one of his friends, a former hit man, who relates a dream he had of standing beside a sea of fire, surrounded by all the people he ever killed.

== Episode list ==
No.	Title	Directed by	Written by	Original release date
1	"Death and Taxes"	Unknown	Unknown	1 March 1993
2	"To Err Is Human"	Unknown	Unknown	8 March 1993
3	"False Witness"	Unknown	Unknown	15 March 1993
4	"A Madness to His Method"	Unknown	Unknown	22 March 1993
5	"Moths to a Flame"	Unknown	Unknown	29 March 1993
6	"Collateral Damage"	Eleanore Lindo	Sanjay Mehta	5 April 1993
7	"Marked Man"	Unknown	Unknown	12 April 1993
8	"Blindside"	Unknown	Unknown	19 April 1993
9	"Love Kills"	Unknown	Unknown	26 April 1993
10	"Convictions of His Courage"	Eleanore Lindo	Sanjay Mehta	1 July 1993
11	"Shadows from the Past"	Unknown	Unknown	8 July 1993
12	"Lapses in Memory"	Unknown	Unknown	15 July 1993
13	"The Yellow Chamber"	Unknown	Unknown	22 July 1993

== Rebroadcast ==
In 1999, Carrie-Anne Moss starred in The Matrix, which had no relationship to the television series apart from its title and Moss' involvement. As a result, Matrix was made available for syndication in Canada and the United States.
