= The Matrix Revolutions =

2003 film by the Wachowskis

- Theatrical release poster
- Directed by: The Wachowskis (Note: Credited as The Wachowski Brothers.)
- Written by: The Wachowskis
- Based on: Characters by The Wachowskis
- Produced by: Joel Silver
- Starring: Keanu Reeves; Laurence Fishburne; Carrie-Anne Moss; Hugo Weaving; Jada Pinkett Smith
- Cinematography: Bill Pope
- Edited by: Zach Staenberg
- Music by: Don Davis
- Production companies: Warner Bros. Pictures; Village Roadshow Pictures; NPV Entertainment; Silver Pictures
- Distributed by: Warner Bros. Pictures
- Release date: November 5, 2003
- Running time: 129 minutes
- Country: United States
- Language: English
- Budget: $110–150 million
- Box office: $427.3 million

The Matrix Revolutions is a 2003 American science fiction action film written and directed by the Wachowskis. It is the third installment in The Matrix film series, shot back-to-back with The Matrix Reloaded (2003). It stars Keanu Reeves, Laurence Fishburne, Carrie-Anne Moss, Hugo Weaving and Jada Pinkett Smith. The film follows Neo and his allies as they fight to end the war between humanity and the machines permanently while opposing the rogue Agent Smith.

The Matrix Revolutions was released worldwide on November 5, 2003, by Warner Bros. Pictures, and was the first live-action feature film to be released in both regular and IMAX theaters simultaneously. Like its predecessor, the video game Enter the Matrix and The Animatrix, a collection of short animations, supported and expanded the film's story. It grossed $427.3 million, becoming the eighth-highest-grossing film of 2003, but marked a decline from both its predecessors and received mixed reviews from critics, who praised the visual effects but criticized the lack of new ideas and characterization, as well as the final battle.

Although The Matrix Revolutions was the final installment in the original trilogy of the series, the storyline of the films was continued in the now-closed video game The Matrix Online (2005). A fourth film, The Matrix Resurrections, was released in 2021.

== Plot ==
Having been rescued by the crew of the Mjolnir in the real world, (Note: As depicted in The Matrix Reloaded (2003).) Neo and Bane's bodies lie in the ship's medical bay. Neo's consciousness is trapped in a subway station named Mobil Ave, a transition zone between the Matrix and the machine world. He meets a "family" of programs, including a girl named Sati. The "father" of Sati tells Neo the subway is controlled by the Trainman, a program loyal to the Merovingian. When Neo tries to board a train with the family, the Trainman refuses and overpowers him.

In the Matrix, Seraph, Morpheus, and Trinity confront the Merovingian and force him to release Neo's consciousness into the Matrix. Neo visits the Oracle, who reveals that Smith intends to destroy both the Matrix and the real world. She says that Smith is Neo's "opposite", resulting from the Matrix attempting to balance itself, and that "everything that has a beginning has an end". After Neo leaves, a large group of Smiths arrives to assimilate the Oracle. She does not resist, and Smith gains her powers of precognition.

Neo returns to his body in the real world. The crews of the Nebuchadnezzar and the Mjolnir find and reactivate Niobe's ship, the Logos. As the captains plan their return to Zion to help its defense, Neo requests a ship to travel to the Machine City. Motivated by her encounter with the Oracle, (Note: As depicted in Enter the Matrix (2003).) Niobe offers him the Logos. Neo departs, accompanied by Trinity.

Bane, whose consciousness has been secretly assimilated by Smith and who has stowed away on the Logos, takes Trinity hostage. Neo realizes Smith has assimilated Bane and, in their fight, Bane blinds Neo with a power cable. Neo discovers he can still "see" machine source code in the real world and uses this ability to kill Bane. Trinity pilots them to the Machine City.

Zion's shipyard is overwhelmed by a horde of Sentinels. Niobe and Morpheus rush toward Zion in the Mjolnir to aid the human defenses. After crashing through the half-open gate, the Mjolnir crew discharge its EMP, disabling all the Sentinels present but also Zion's remaining defenses. The humans are forced to retreat and wait for the next attack, thinking it will be their last stand.

The Logos approaches Machine City and is besieged by machines. Neo shuts several of them down using his newfound powers but passes out from exhaustion. To avoid their attackers, Trinity flies above them, briefly glimpsing the open sky before crashing. Impaled in the crash, Trinity declares her love for Neo before dying. Neo enters the Machine City and encounters the machine leader, the "Deus Ex Machina". (Note: The "Deus Ex Machina" is mentioned in the credits for the film—Not to be confused with the plot device of the same name : Deus ex Machina) Neo warns them that Smith threatens both the machine and human worlds. He offers to stop Smith in exchange for peace between humans and machines. The Deus Ex Machina agrees and the Sentinels pause their attack on Zion.

The machines plug Neo into the Matrix, whose population of humans and programs has now been entirely assimilated by Smith. The Smith-assimilated Oracle confronts Neo, having foreseen that he will be the one to defeat Neo. After a protracted fight, Smith recalls a vision and tells Neo that "everything that has a beginning has an end", unknowingly repeating what the Oracle had said to Neo earlier. This appears to cause Neo to concede defeat and allow himself to be assimilated. In the Machine City, pulses of energy surge into Neo's body, which destroys Smith-assimilated Neo and all the Smiths in the Matrix. This seemingly kills Neo but restores everyone else in the Matrix, including the Oracle. The Sentinels withdraw from Zion and the city rejoices.

The Matrix is rebooted. The Architect confronts the Oracle, scolding her for having "played a dangerous game", but begrudgingly concedes that those who desire to leave the Matrix will be freed. After the Architect leaves, Seraph asks the Oracle if she had always known Neo would save them. She replies that she did not, but she believed.

== Cast ==
- Keanu Reeves as Neo
- Laurence Fishburne as Morpheus
- Carrie-Anne Moss as Trinity
- Hugo Weaving as Smith
- Jada Pinkett Smith as Niobe
- Monica Bellucci as Persephone
- Lambert Wilson as the Merovingian
- Mary Alice (Note: Gloria Foster, who played the Oracle in the first two films, died before the completion of her filming for the third. She was replaced by Mary Alice. Her changed appearance is addressed in the film's plot.) as the Oracle
- Helmut Bakaitis as the Architect
- Harold Perrineau as Link
- Tanveer K. Atwal as Sati
- Bernard White as Rama Kandra
- Collin Chou as Seraph
- Nona Gaye as Zee
- Gina Torres as Cas
- Bruce Spence as the Trainman
- Ian Bliss as Bane
- Harry Lennix as Commander Lock
- Anthony Zerbe as Councillor Hamann
- Nathaniel Lees as Captain Mifune
- Clayton Watson as Kid
- Cornel West as Councillor West
- David Roberts as Captain Roland
- Anthony Wong as Ghost
- Tharini Mudaliar as Kamala
- Henry Blasingame (motion capture) as Deus Ex Machina
  - Kevin Michael Richardson as the voice of Deus Ex Machina
- Robert Mammone as AK
- Genevieve O’Reilly as Officer Wirtz
- Essie Davis as Maggie

Zee was originally played by Aaliyah, who died in a plane crash on August 25, 2001, before filming was complete, requiring her scenes to be reshot with Nona Gaye. Jet Li was offered the role of Seraph, but turned it down as he did not want his martial arts moves digitally recorded.

== Production ==
The film's budget was estimated between US$110 million and $150 million.

Filming occurred concurrently with its predecessor, The Matrix Reloaded, and live-action sequences for the video game Enter the Matrix. This took place primarily at Fox Studios in Sydney, Australia. Most notably, the subway scenes were filmed at the disused tunnels of St James railway station, and the end sequence with the Oracle and the Architect was filmed in the Royal Botanic Garden. Carrie-Anne Moss injured her ankle during the shooting in Australia.

=== Soundtrack ===
In contrast to its predecessors, very few "source" tracks are used in the film. Aside from Don Davis' score, again collaborating with Juno Reactor, only one external track (by Pale 3) is used. Although Davis rarely focuses on strong melodies, familiar leitmotifs from earlier in the series reappear. For example, Neo and Trinity's love theme—which briefly surfaces in the two preceding films—is finally fully expanded into "Trinity Definitely"; the theme from the Zion docks in Reloaded returns as "Men in Metal", and the energetic drumming from the Reloaded tea house fight between Neo and Seraph opens "Tetsujin", as Seraph, Trinity and Morpheus fight off Club Hel's three doormen. The climactic battle theme, named "Neodämmerung" (in reference to Wagner's Götterdämmerung), features a choir singing extracts (shlokas) from the Pavamana Mantra, introduced in the Upanishads. The chorus can be roughly translated from Sanskrit as follows: "lead us from untruth to truth, lead us from darkness to light, lead us from death to immortality, peace peace peace". The extracts were brought to Davis by the Wachowskis when he informed them that it would be wasteful for such a large choir to be singing simple "ooh"s and "aah"s (according to the DVD commentary, Davis felt that the dramatic impact of the piece would be lost if the choir was to sing 'This is the one, see what he can do' in plain English). These extracts return in the film's denouement, and in Navras, the track that plays over the closing credits (which may be considered a loose remix of "Neodämmerung").

== Release ==
The Matrix Revolutions was released in theaters roughly three weeks after The Matrix Reloaded arrived on DVD, on October 14, 2003.

The film had the widest release ever opening simultaneously in 108 territories at 1400 Greenwich Mean Time on November 5, 2003.

=== Home media ===
The Matrix Revolutions was released on DVD and VHS on April 6, 2004. The film grossed $116 million in DVD sales. Additionally, it was released on 4K Ultra HD Blu-ray on October 30, 2018.

== Reception ==
=== Box office ===
On opening day, The Matrix Revolutions scored $24.3 million, becoming the third-highest Wednesday opening, behind The Lord of the Rings: The Two Towers and Star Wars: Episode I – The Phantom Menace. During its three-day opening weekend, it earned $48.5 million. In its first five days of release, the film grossed $83.8 million in the United States and Canada from 3,502 theaters, but dropped 66% during the second week. For three years, it had the highest five-day Wednesday opening for any Warner Bros. film until it was overtaken by Superman Returns in 2006. The film even competed against the newly released family films Brother Bear and Elf.

Internationally, the film grossed $119 million in its first 5 days from 10,013 prints in 107 territories, with the third-biggest opening ever in Japan and Spain and the fourth biggest in the United Kingdom, Italy and Mexico. Combined, it grossed $203 million in its first five days. This made it the highest worldwide opening weekend for any film, holding the record until it was beaten by The Lord of the Rings: The Return of the King a month later. The Matrix Revolutions also achieved the record for having the biggest international opening weekend for an R-rated film until 2015 when it was surpassed by Fifty Shades of Grey. The film grossed over $139 million in North America and approximately $427 million worldwide, roughly half of The Matrix Reloaded box-office total, and was the eighth-highest-grossing film of 2003.

=== Critical response ===
On review aggregation website Rotten Tomatoes, The Matrix Revolutions holds an approval rating of 33% based on 215 reviews and an average rating of 5.30/10. The site's critical consensus reads, "A disappointing conclusion to the Matrix trilogy as characters and ideas take a back seat to the special effects." On Metacritic, the film has a weighted average score of 47 out of 100 based on 41 reviews, indicating "mixed or average reviews". Audiences polled by CinemaScore gave the film an average grade of "B" on an A+ to F scale, a grade down from the "B+" earned by the previous film and two grades down from the "A−" earned by the first film, therefore the second lowest grade earned by a film in the series.

Some critics criticized the film for being anticlimactic. Additionally, some critics regard the film as less philosophically ambiguous than its predecessor, The Matrix Reloaded. Critics had difficulty finding closure pertaining to events from The Matrix Reloaded, and were generally dissatisfied.

Roger Ebert of the Chicago Sun-Times gave the film three stars out of four, despite offering criticisms of his own, on the grounds that it at least provided closure to the story well enough so that fans following the series would prefer seeing it to not seeing it.

== Sequel ==
While making the Matrix films, the Wachowskis told their close collaborators that at that time they had no intention of making another installment after The Matrix Revolutions. Instead, they gave their blessing to the notion of gamers "inherit[ing] the storyline", and The Matrix Online video game was billed as the official continuation. In February 2015, in interviews promoting Jupiter Ascending, Lilly Wachowski called a return to The Matrix a "particularly repelling idea in these times", noting the studios' tendency to green-light sequels, reboots, and adaptations over original material, while Lana Wachowski, addressing rumors about a potential reboot, said that they had not heard anything, but she believed that the studio might be looking to replace them. At various times, Keanu Reeves and Hugo Weaving have stated that they would be willing to reprise their roles in potential Matrix films, but only if the Wachowskis were involved.

In March 2017, The Hollywood Reporter wrote that Warner Bros. was in early stages of developing a relaunch of the franchise, with Zak Penn in talks to write a treatment, and interest in getting Michael B. Jordan attached to star. According to the article neither the Wachowskis nor Joel Silver were involved at that stage, although the studio wanted to get at minimum the blessing of the Wachowskis.

Warner Bros. officially announced the development on a fourth film in August 2019, with Lana Wachowski serving as director and producer on it. Lana wrote the screenplay with David Mitchell and Aleksander Hemon. Grant Hill produced it alongside Lana. The production is a joint-venture between Warner Bros. Pictures and Village Roadshow Pictures, similar to the original films. Keanu Reeves and Carrie-Anne Moss reprise their roles from the previous films; Laurence Fishburne and Hugo Weaving do not appear in the film. Production began in February 2020 in San Francisco, briefly halted due to the COVID-19 pandemic, and wrapped in November of that same year. The film, The Matrix Resurrections, had its world premiere in Toronto, Canada on December 16, 2021, and was released in theaters and on HBO Max on December 22, 2021.

== See also ==
- List of films featuring powered exoskeletons
