= The Matrix: Path of Neo =

2005 action-adventure video game

- North American PlayStation 2 cover art
- Developer: Shiny Entertainment
- Publisher: Atari
- Directors: The Wachowskis; Michael "Saxs" Persson
- Producer: Todd Morgan
- Designer: Shawn Berryhill
- Programmer: Søren Hannibal
- Artist: Chandana "Eka" Ekanayake
- Writer: The Wachowskis
- Composers: Tobias Enhus; Machine Head
- Series: The Matrix
- Platforms: Microsoft Windows; PlayStation 2; Xbox
- Release: PlayStation 2, Xbox: NA: November 8, 2005; EU: November 11, 2005; Microsoft Windows: NA: November 8, 2005; EU: November 25, 2005
- Genre: Action-adventure
- Mode: Single-player

The Matrix: Path of Neo is a 2005 action-adventure video game developed by Shiny Entertainment and published by Atari. The game was written and co-directed by the Wachowskis, who wrote and directed the first three The Matrix films and the 2003 video game Enter the Matrix, also developed by Shiny Entertainment. Players control the character Neo, participating in scenes from the films.

The game received mixed reviews from critics.

== Gameplay ==
Players, as Neo, use a variety of combat styles and weapons to defeat enemies.

Players assume the role of Neo, with the objective of guiding the character through the events of The Matrix trilogy, supported by montages of edited cutscenes sourced from the films. Some levels imitate the scenes of the films, other extend them, or take entirely different directions. In some sequences, players can make choices to diverge from the events of the film; for instance, guiding Neo to escape an office building instead of surrendering to police, or choosing the blue pill instead of the red pill.

Path of Neo is a action video game featuring melee and ranged combat, with players able to punch and kick, use guns, hatchets, swords, guns and explosives to defeat enemies. Players undertake a series of opening tutorials to introduce melee, sword fighting and shooting mechanics, including an action sequence that dynamically sets the game's difficulty level based on their performance. Melee attacks are controlled with an attack and a stun button, which can be combined to create different combinations of moves. Controllers can be used to select a target for ranged combat, or a single button press can switch between targeted enemies. A Focus meter, once filled, allows players to use enter a Focus mode, which unlocks the use of more powerful combinations. Players unlock additional upgrades in between missions.

== Development and release ==
=== Development ===
Path of Neo was the second The Matrix title released by developer Shiny Entertainment following Enter the Matrix, and was released following the completion of the original trilogy of the film series. The commercial success of Enter The Matrix prompted publisher Atari to acquire the studio from their parent company Interplay Entertainment for $47 million. However, Enter the Matrix was a critical disappointment despite its commercial performance; animation director Gabriel Rountree stated the studio was rushed to complete the first title, and the development process of Path of Neo started with "figuring out what went wrong" to "make it the game we really wanted". Studio founder David Perry stated a key area of feedback from players was the desire to play as Neo and use his abilities, prompting an idea to change the plot of The Matrix series to "see it from the perspective" of the character. Perry and several developers recounted to Polygon that the scope of the game was less restricted, with the design objective to make "something cool" or "fun" and allowing the developers to realise creative goals.

Development of Path of Neo took place over a two-year development cycle involving a team of 60 to 80 staff, involving most of the team that created Enter the Matrix. Developers recounted that the pace of development was more relaxed than Enter the Matrix, with the final six months dedicated to testing and refining the game. Path of Neo was developed using an enhanced version of the engine from Enter The Matrix, featuring the Havok 2 Physics engine allowing for destructible environments, with a scene featuring 1,500 copies of Agent Smith showcased to demonstrate the capabilities of the engine. Rountree stated 4,000 animations were designed for the game's combat, mostly choreographed using motion capture and then manually edited to make moves feel "superhuman" and "fun to play", using techniques such as real-time inverse kinematics to create the illusion of realistic blocks.

The Matrix directors The Wachowskis were actively involved in the development of the game as creative directors and writers, developing new story elements for its narrative, re-editing scenes from the film and providing feedback through the game's development. Laurence Fishburne was also recruited to provide new lines of dialogue for the game as Morpheus. The Wachowskis also sought to develop an alternate ending to the narrative to contrast with the pessimistic ending of The Matrix Revolutions. Prompted by the suggestion of the studio to introduce a boss fight, the Wachowskis responded by proposing to end the game with a Godzilla-inspired hulk of Agent Smith clones. The sisters also suggested the sequence where they would make a cameo appearance as pixellated avatars to explain the reasons for deviating from the film's ending. Art director Chandana Ekanayake stated it was intended as a light-hearted "creative reaction" by the sisters to the film trilogy, and director Saxs Persson speculated their decisions to end the game by breaking the fourth wall intended to "send off" the series by having their view heard directly.

=== Release ===
Atari announced Path of Neo in February 2005, and showcased it at E3 in May 2005 and the Tokyo Games Show in September. Preview coverage of the game was mixed: IGN described it as one of the best games previewed at E3 for 'Technological Excellence', finding its effects "incredibly convincing" and its engine featuring "impressive real-time performance" and "some of the best depth of field effects we've seen in this generation". GameSpot considered its action sequences were "extremely fun", but felt the visuals of the PC version were dated and inconsistent in quality. PlayStation 2 Magazine staff were "split" on the preview, writing the game "looks sensational" and featured "cooler characters, scenes and moves", although experienced camera and performance issues, and felt the game was "two years too late".

Path of Neo was released in the United States on 8 November 2005.

== Reception ==
=== Sales ===
Path of Neo shipped 1.5 million copies, and sold 500,000 units in the United States by October 2006 according to NPD Group sales figures. Atari, who had experienced a downturn in revenue in 2006, cited poor retail performances from the game among reasons for its financial losses. The company announced reductions in its workforce and a turn away from internal development, and that its internal studios including Shiny Entertainment would be sold. The company was sold to Foundation 9 Entertainment for an estimated $20 million.

=== Critical reviews ===
Reception

Aggregate scores
Aggregator	Score		
Aggregator	PC	PS2	Xbox
GameRankings	64%	71%	72%
Metacritic	64/100	69/100	73/100

Review scores
Publication	Score		
Publication	PC	PS2	Xbox
Edge	N/A	5/10	N/A
Electronic Gaming Monthly	N/A	6.5/10	6.5/10
Eurogamer	N/A	7/10	N/A
Famitsu	N/A	26/40	N/A
Game Informer	N/A	7.25/10	7.25/10
GamePro	N/A	4/5	4/5
GameSpot	6.8/10	7.3/10	7.3/10
GameSpy	N/A	2/5	2.5/5
GameZone	6.7/10	7.9/10	8/10
IGN	6.5/10	7.8/10	7.8/10
Official U.S. PlayStation Magazine	N/A	3/5	N/A
Official Xbox Magazine (US)	N/A	N/A	7/10
PC Gamer (US)	67%	N/A	N/A

The Matrix: Path of Neo received "mixed or average reviews" on all platforms according to video game review aggregator Metacritic.

In Japan, Famitsu gave the PlayStation 2 version a score of one seven, two sixes, and one seven, for a total of 26 out of 40. The New York Times gave it a positive review and stated: "After spawning two mediocre sequels, a collection of dull cartoon shorts and a couple of forgettable video games, there is some life left in the Matrix franchise after all, as this game proves." USA Today, however, gave it six stars out of ten and stated that the game "underwhelms, failing to convey the spark and visual appeal of the films."

=== Retrospective reception ===
Retrospectively assessing Path of Neo as the "best Matrix game we have", Rock Paper Shotgun considered it was "bags of fun" to play and featured "a lot to like", although found its live-action cutscenes "trashy". Retro Gamer also wrote that whilst it failed to meet audience expectations upon release, its criticism was "a tad unjust" and felt it was "innovative, captured the spirit of the films brilliantly and offered a silly amount of fan service". Screen Rant praised the game as a "solid experience" for players seeking to imitate the "grandiose" fights in the film series.

Critics have also retrospectively expressed bemusement at the ending sequence of the game. Polygon wrote they were unsure of whether it was intended as satire, a personal statement from the Wachowskis, or a "love letter to the ridiculousness of action games". Comic Book assessed that Path of Neo served as a coda for the Matrix series and whilst its ending was "self-aware", it was "purposefully strange" and "one of the most memorably bizarre endings in gaming history". EA and THQ creative producer Danny Bilson used the game's expansion of the narrative of The Matrix as an example of successful transmedia storytelling.
