= Agent (The Matrix) =

Fictional characters in the sci-fi franchise; antagonists

- The Matrix character
- From left to right: Agents Brown, Smith, and Jones
- First appearance: The Matrix (1999)
- Last appearance: The Matrix Resurrections (2021)
- Created by: The Wachowskis

In-universe information
- Species: Computer program
- Gender: Male
- Occupation: Operative, enforcer

The Agents are a group of characters in the fictional universe of The Matrix franchise. They are guardians within the computer-generated world of the Matrix, protecting it from anyone or anything (most often Redpills) that could reveal it as a false reality or threaten it in any other way. Agents also hunt down and terminate any rogue programs, such as The Keymaker, which no longer serve a purpose to the overall Machine objective. They are sentient computer programs disguised as human government agents, physically appearing as human but with a tendency to speak and act in highly precise and mechanical ways.

A notable individual Agent is Agent Smith, played by Hugo Weaving. He is introduced alongside his colleagues Agents Jones (Robert Taylor) and Brown (Paul Goddard) in the first The Matrix film in 1999. Other Agent characters have appeared in various media adaptations of the Matrix franchise.

== Physical aspects ==
Agents appear in the guise of human government agents, wearing black-green business suits lined with a gold fabric, white dress shirts, black dress shoes, dark green neckties with a silver bar clip, square sunglasses, and a communication earpiece. These features are copied from the attire for plainclothes agents of the United States Secret Service, as well as those of the Men in Black conspiracy or the stereotypical G-Man/FBI official. All known individual Agents within The Matrix universe appear as Caucasian males. In The Matrix Reloaded, six months after the facts of The Matrix, the Source deployed the upgraded Agents Jackson, Johnson, and Thompson (portrayed by Daniel Bernhardt, David A. Kilde and Matt McColm), designed specifically by the Machines to defeat The One. Unlike the original Agents, they had a change of appearance: their suit jackets were lighter and had more of a grayish-green tone, they were bulkier, wider and taller in appearance. The Upgraded Agents also spoke with a slight, almost unnoticeable reverb effect to their voices, which made them sound intimidating even while discussing mundane matters; unlike the regular Agents who sounded perfectly normal.

Agents are, in fact, highly advanced artificial intelligence entities, programmed with a number of superhuman abilities. As Agents do not exist in their own bodies as other programs do, being "killed" is a temporary inconvenience. Rather, they take over the virtualized body of a Bluepill—a human directly connected to the Matrix—which transforms into the Agent's form until the Agent leaves the body.

== Analysis ==
William Irwin said that the agents "are impersonal, generic and interchangeable" in contrast to the main characters who "are complex, different, and complementary".

Lisa Nakamura said of Morpheus's initiative, "A black man leads the resistance or slave revolt against the machines, who are visible to us as Anglo-Saxon 'agents' wearing suits. They all look the same, as one would expect machines to do, but most importantly they all look white and middle class in a way that no one in the resistance does." Morpheus tells Agent Smith in one scene, "You all look the same to me." Nakamura said, "Primarily, the presence of people of color in the film lets us know we are in the realm of the real; machine-induced fantasies and wish fulfillments, which is what the matrix is, are knowable to us by their distinctive and consistent whiteness." Nakamura says the agents visually represent the machines' hegemonic regime in having associations with corporations and cops. The agents wear business suits, and they are "clearly allied with the hegemonic machine". The scene in which multiple white agents beat the black Morpheus is reminiscent of Rodney King being beaten by the Los Angeles Police Department.

Stephen Faller said of the Agents that "fear seems to be the entry point", that "only when someone is afraid or startled can he or she become an unwilling Agent".

Glenn Yeffetch described the agents as "software modules within the Matrix" that "are intelligent but mindless automata", with the film having no mention of quantum computing for accessing consciousness. He said that Agent Smith saying, "It's the smell, if there's such a thing," reveals the automation in which an agent doubts that a "noncomputable quality" is real and cannot differentiate between senses, where humans can find them "irreducibly different".

== See also ==
- Men in Black
- G-Man
- Simulated reality
