= Neo (The Matrix) =

Fictional character

- The Matrix character
- Keanu Reeves as Neo in The Matrix (1999)
- First appearance: The Matrix (1999)
- Last appearance: The Matrix Resurrections (2021)
- Created by: The Wachowskis
- Portrayed by: Keanu Reeves
- Voiced by: Keanu Reeves (The Animatrix, Enter the Matrix); Andrew Bowen (The Matrix: Path of Neo)

In-universe information
- Full name: Thomas A. Anderson
- Alias: Neo
- Nicknames: The Anomaly (name for him given by the machines); Mr. Anderson (Agent Smith calls him by his Matrix name)
- Gender: Male
- Title: The One
- Occupation: Hacker; The One, an anagram for Neo; Former software engineer (in the Matrix simulation); Former video game developer (in the Matrix simulation)
- Family: John Anderson (father); Michelle McGahey (mother)
- Significant other: Trinity
- Nationality: American
- Fighting style: Jeet Kune Do; Taekwondo; Drunken boxing Savate; Kenpō (Karate); Jiu-Jitsu; Krav Maga; Budo; Wushu
- Age: 28 (The Matrix–Revolutions); 88 (biologically 48; Resurrections)

Neo (born as Thomas A. Anderson, also known as The One) is a fictional character and the protagonist of The Matrix franchise, created by the Wachowskis. He was portrayed as a cybercriminal and computer programmer by Keanu Reeves in the films, as well as having a cameo in The Animatrix short film Kid's Story. Andrew Bowen provided Neo's voice in The Matrix: Path of Neo. In 2021, Reeves reprised his role in The Matrix Resurrections with what Vulture calls "his signature John Wick look".

In 2008, Neo was selected by Empire as the 68th Greatest Movie Character of All Time. "Neo" is also an anagram of "one", a reference to his destiny of being The One who would bring peace. There are claims that a nightclub in Chicago inspired the name of the character. Neo is considered to be a superhero.

== Fictional character biography ==
Thomas A. Anderson was born in Lower Downtown, Capital City, USA on March 11, 1962, according to his criminal record, or September 13, 1971 according to his passport (both seen in the film). His mother was Michelle McGahey (the name of the first film's art director) and his father was John Anderson. He attended Central West Junior High and Owen Patterson High (named after the film's production designer). In high school, he excelled at science, math and computer courses, and displayed an aptitude for literature and history. Although he had disciplinary troubles when he was thirteen to fourteen years old, Anderson went on to become a respected member of the school community through his involvement in football and hockey.

At the start of the series, Neo is one of billions of humans neurally connected to the Matrix, unaware that the world he lives in is a simulated reality.

=== The Matrix ===
In his normal life, he is a quiet programmer for the "respectable software company" Meta Cortex, while in private, he is a computer hacker who penetrates computer systems illicitly and steals information under his hacker alias "Neo". He also sells illegal untraceable computer systems and hacking programs along with controlling computer viruses stashed on CDs and diskettes. During his time as a hacker, Anderson has learned about something known only as "The Matrix".

During the years prior to the events of The Matrix, Neo has spent his time trying to find the one man who he thought could tell him what the Matrix was, a supposed terrorist known only as Morpheus. After an encounter with another hacker, Trinity, Anderson is suddenly contacted by Morpheus via a cell phone mailed to his office, but is almost immediately captured by the virtual reality's Agents, led by Agent Smith. After refusing to cooperate with the agents, Neo has an electronic bug implanted within his Matrix-simulated body so that his actions can be tracked, and those seeking to make contact from the free world can be traced and destroyed. He is then contacted by Trinity, freed from the bug, and taken to meet Morpheus.

Neo is offered a choice to remain in his everyday life and forget about the Matrix or to learn what the Matrix really is. Choosing the latter option, he takes a drug (commonly called the "red pill"), which is actually a program designed to disrupt his mind's neural connection to the Matrix and make it easier for his real body to be found and awakened in the real world. He wakes up disoriented and alarmed to find himself naked, weak, and hairless in a pod full of what can be assumed to be an artificial amniotic fluid. He also discovers that he is connected to a series of thick cables, by way of a number of plugs that are grafted to his body, including one plugged directly into the base of his skull, which is later explained as the means through which his mind was connected to the Matrix. Upon his "birthing" into the real world, he is discovered by a machine that grabs him by the neck and removes all of his plugs and cables before flushing him out of his fluid tank down into the cold sewers below the Earth's surface.

Neo is rescued by Morpheus, and his body is healed of the effects of his atrophy incurred while inside the pod. Once Neo regains consciousness and mobility, Morpheus tells Neo the truth about the Matrix; it is a simulated world to which humans are connected, "a prison for your mind", as stated by Morpheus, while unknown to them, their bodies are used as a power source for a race of sentient machines that, ironically, mankind created. He also tells Neo about the One, a human with the power to manipulate the Matrix, who has been foretold to end the war between humans and machines, and says that he believes Neo is the One.

The next day, Neo begins his "training" and eventually masters many forms of combat, as well as vehicle and weapons operations, by having various training programs uploaded directly into his brain. He also receives further instruction from Morpheus on subjects such as "freeing his mind" from the restrictions of the Matrix, essentially overcoming the physics engine the Matrix operates on. He is also informed of the existence of its agents, programs designed by the machines to maintain order and dominance over the human race, created with abilities such as dodging bullets, running at high speeds, jumping great distances, and physically possessing people in the Matrix. If killed, they simply find a new host to overcome.

After several days aboard Morpheus' hovercraft, the Nebuchadnezzar, Neo is taken to meet the Oracle, who has the power of foresight within the simulated world. She tells him that he has the "gift", but appeared to be waiting for something, and that in his present life he is not the One. The Oracle warns him that a situation will arise when he will have to choose between saving his own life or that of Morpheus.

Returning from the Oracle to a landline phone, which serves as the exit for "red pills" to leave the Matrix, the crew of Morpheus's ship is betrayed by Cypher, a "red pill" who is willing to give the agents Morpheus in exchange for the promise of being mentally erased and reconnected permanently to the Matrix as an escape from the real world's bleakness. In the Matrix, SWAT troops kill Mouse. Cypher jacks out and grabs a real-world lightning gun, injuring Tank and killing Dozer. He kills Apoc and Switch, who remain jacked in, by prematurely terminating their connections. In the Matrix, Smith defeats and captures Morpheus. Neo and Trinity try to jack out, but Cypher threatens to unplug them too; however, he is thwarted when Tank recovers, killing Cypher and helping Neo and Trinity jack out.

Neo learns that the Agents seek to hack into Morpheus's brain in order to force him to tell them the access codes to the mainframe computer within humanity's last refuge, the city of Zion. After refusing to sacrifice Morpheus to prevent this, Neo decides to jack in and attack the building where he is being held. He and Trinity proceed to fight their way to the roof level of the building, where they are confronted by agent Jones. Neo unloads two entire magazines on Jones as he dodges each bullet effortlessly. When Jones returns fire, Neo proves capable of dodging bullets himself, fluidly moving in a way only an agent was thought to be capable of, although he is not yet as fast as them, as his leg is grazed by a bullet. Trinity then shoots Jones at point-blank range. Using an armed chopper, Neo and Trinity successfully rescue Morpheus. As Neo has just successfully rescued comrades from a building protected by heavily armed guards and agents (thought to be an unprecedented feat), Tank and Morpheus both believe that Neo is indeed the One. Neo tries to tell Morpheus what the Oracle told him, but Morpheus explains that she merely told Neo what he needed to hear; had he believed himself to be the One, he would likely not have attempted the rescue, which was a necessary step to his emergence as the One.

Reaching the landline phone, Morpheus and Trinity return to the real world, but Neo is trapped by agent Smith. Trinity admonishes Neo to run, but he stands his ground, having begun to believe that he may be the One. Neo and Smith draw guns and fire them empty, but are able to effortlessly dodge each other's fire. Neo skillfully engages Smith in hand-to-hand combat, almost seeming to be Smith's equal. In the end, Neo is briefly incapacitated and held by Smith as a subway train approaches, but at the last minute, he is able to get free and backflip up onto the platform, leaving Smith to be run over. However, the agent possesses the body of the conductor and emerges from the train. Neo, realizing that the agents' ability to possess other bodies makes this a fight he cannot win, flees the subway station.

Pursued by Smith and his fellow agents, Neo is able to evade them and reach the location of the landline phone, just to be ambushed and fatally shot in the chest by Smith. Trinity, seeing Neo die in the real world while his mind is still in the Matrix, tells his evidently lifeless body that the Oracle had foretold that she would fall in love with the One. When kissed by Trinity, Neo is revived, finally fully emerging as the One. When the agents try to kill him again, Neo simply raises his hand, and the bullets freeze in mid-air, then drop harmlessly to the ground. It is then shown that he is able to perceive, interpret, and alter the computer code of the Matrix. Completely believing in his new-found powers, he effortlessly fends off agent Smith before forcing himself into the agent's body and destroying it from within. The other two agents quickly flee.

Neo is then seen leaving a message for the machines via phone, warning that he plans to oppose them by freeing as many human minds as possible. He then hangs up and flies into the sky, now having completely made his final metamorphosis into becoming the One.

=== The Matrix Reloaded ===
Approximately six months have passed since the events of the first film, and Neo, now Trinity's lover and fully confident in his powers as the One, is able to tremendously manipulate the artificial world within the Matrix. He no longer requires firearms, relying solely on hand-to-hand combat. His ability to influence the coding of the Matrix allows him to stop incoming fire from multiple attackers. Dispensing with the long black trenchcoat and black shirt he wears at the conclusion of The Matrix, Neo now prefers a cassock with a high-rise mandarin collar giving the appearance of a priest or bishop. Neo seeks more advice from the Oracle, unsure of his purpose, while Zion prepares for a massive attack by the Machines from over 250,000 sentinels, numbered precisely relative to the population of Zion of 250,000 people. The Oracle directs him on a quest to find the Keymaker, a personified program that has access to numerous backdoors within the system and will be able to lead Neo safely to the Source, the programming heart of the machine world, which contains the programs sustaining the Matrix.

After the Oracle leaves, Agent Smith (aka Smith) appears and it is revealed that Neo had separated Smith from the rest of the Matrix code by shattering him, giving him a life independent of the machine's systems and now the two of them share a "connection" to each other. Smith is no longer an agent of the Matrix, but has become more virus-like; he is able to insert his code into other systems, and infect other programs and human minds to make copies of himself. Neo fends off hundreds of these Smiths and escapes. Later, he, Morpheus and Trinity steal the Keymaker from his keeper, the Merovingian. During this time, Neo stays behind to fight off the Merovingian's men and becomes separated from the others, being trapped in the Merovingian's mansion five hundred miles away in the mountains. He flies off to help them and only just arrives in time to save Morpheus and the Keymaker from two agents crashing two trucks together.

The Keymaker explains that two power stations elsewhere in the Matrix must be disabled in a short time window to successfully disable the security system of a building where the door to the Source will appear, allowing Neo to reach it. This task is accomplished, but the Keymaker is killed, a hovercraft is destroyed and Trinity is jeopardized by the agents of the Matrix, illustrating a vision that Neo has seen earlier in his dreams. Entering the door, Neo finds himself confronted by the Architect, a program which created and designed the Matrix and also ensures its constant stability.

The Architect presents Neo with a radically different explanation of his origins and purpose, claiming that Neo is actually the sixth "One". He goes on to say that Zion has been destroyed by the machines five times before; faced with the dilemma of allowing humanity to be destroyed or allowing the machines' preferred status quo to be reconstructed, Neo's five predecessors have helped reload or restart the Matrix, before being allowed to rebuild Zion with a handful of freed humans. The productive output of the Matrix is based upon this repeated cycle of destruction and recreation, to keep the human minds which power it in a stable structure because not every human accepts the simulated reality and if enough of them accumulate, it could cause a catastrophic system crash of the Matrix and subsequent extinction of both humanity and the Machines. The Oracle is as much part of that self-perpetuating design as the Architect and the prophecy of the One is designed to ensure it runs smoothly each time.

The Architect warns of the annihilation of all human life in and out of the Matrix if he does not enter the Source door to reload the Matrix, but unlike his predecessors, Neo does not enter the door to the Source; he chooses not to believe the Architect's dire warnings of consequences and to save Trinity instead. Returning to the Matrix, he catches Trinity as she falls from an upper-story window of a power plant. She dies of a gunshot wound to the heart that she sustains during the fall, but Neo brings her back to life by reaching into her virtual body, removing the bullet and restarting her heart.

Together, they exit the Matrix and return to the real world. Neo tells Morpheus that the prophecy was merely another system of control and that Zion's destruction is imminent. A group of sentinels begin to converge on their hovercraft, so Neo and the others are forced to abandon it and flee as it is destroyed. As they flee, Neo suddenly discovers that he can now sense the sentinels and shuts them down telepathically; however, the effort causes him to fall unconscious. He and the crew are rescued by the hovercraft Mjolnir (also known as the Hammer) whose crew is dealing with a mystery in the form of Bane, a crew member from another ship who is the only survivor of an ill-fated attack by the Zion fleet. Unbeknownst to anyone, Bane's mind was destroyed by Smith at some point during the movie's events during which Smith overwrote himself over Bane's avatar, effectively killing Bane and once he was unplugged, taking over Bane's real body.

=== The Matrix Revolutions ===
The Matrix Revolutions begins immediately after the events of the second movie; as a result of his struggle with the sentinels, Neo returns to consciousness finding himself caught in an isolated train station-like limbo only accessible by order of the Merovingian, from which his mind is unable to free itself. It is here that he meets Sati, a young program created without a purpose, who is being smuggled into the Matrix by her parents, also programs in the machine world. Neo remains trapped until he is freed by Trinity (assisted by Morpheus and Seraph), who threatens the Merovingian in a Mexican standoff.

After a final visit to the Oracle, Neo learns that he has powers over the machines which extend beyond the Matrix and that Smith is spreading, threatening to destroy both the Matrix and the real world. Building on the Oracle's previous explanations about the nature of choice, Neo learns that the Architect's assertion that his choice to save Trinity would inherently lead to the extinction of humankind was incorrect, due to his nature as a purely mathematical being rendering him incapable of seeing past choices made by humans, as he considers them mere variables in equations. Having told Neo that he now has the power to choose to end the war and defeat Smith, the Oracle then states "everything that has a beginning has an end, Neo" and informs him that in order for true peace to happen, he must travel to the heavily guarded Machine City in the real world and make a truce with the machines in order to save both races from extinction because of Smith's activities. Soon after Neo leaves, dozens of Smiths come and assimilate Seraph, Sati and the Oracle.

Neo and Trinity are given the Logos, a hovercraft commanded by Morpheus's former lover, Niobe, in what seems to others as a suicidal journey to the Machine City. Meanwhile, Captain Roland and the Nebuchadnezzar's surviving crew of Link and Morpheus in the hovercraft Hammer/Mjolnir return to Zion, which is now besieged and losing to the Machines. Neo and Trinity are ambushed by the stowaway Bane/Smith, who blinds Neo with an electric cable, but is killed when Neo discovers an ability to "see" programs and machines independently without his eyesight. Neo, with Trinity as pilot, guides the Logos past the Machine City's defenses, but in the effort the Logos crash-lands, and Trinity sustains fatal injuries and dies.

Neo encounters the Deus Ex Machina, a giant machine construct and the leader of the machines. He offers Smith's defeat and destruction to the Deus in exchange for a truce. The offer is accepted; Neo enters the Matrix to find that Smith has copied himself throughout the simulated world, now truly threatening the safety and stability of the Matrix. One of the copies of Smith, having assimilated the Oracle and obtained as much freedom and control over the virtual world as Neo, faces Neo alone. For a while, the two fight evenly with no real advantage, but ultimately, the tireless Smith begins to wear out Neo and takes control of the fight. Realizing that he cannot win with brute force, Neo allows Smith to assimilate him, which enables the machines to eradicate the Smith virus directly through his body. Unfortunately, the process also kills Neo.

Neo's body is taken away by the machines in the Machine City, while below in Zion, the machines stop their attack and depart in deference to the peace that Neo bartered. The Matrix is rebooted and a beautiful sunrise appears over the horizon, created by Sati in Neo's honor.

=== The Matrix Online ===
The fate of Neo was never truly revealed in the MMORPG sequel, The Matrix Online; however, despite this, his influence had a strong impact on several key events throughout the game.

In the beginning, scattered code fragments of Neo's "RSI" (Residual Self Image) were found on the bodies of the impostor agents; who appeared across the Mega City during Chapter 1.1 (later revealed to be sentinels under the command of the general program) when held, these fragments echoed some of the final thoughts of Neo inside the redpill's mind. Each of the three main post-war political organizations inside the Matrix realized the possible significance of these fragments and began fighting amongst themselves to gather as many as they could.

The Oracle reveals a secret society of exiles known only as the Shapers, who are the only ones able to bring the Fragments together in any significant way and that they must be protected from the impostor agents' corruption. The redpills' distrust and organizational differences prove too much for any strong unity, so that a shaper fell into the captivity of the false agents. His power was used to encode some part of the One's being onto them, creating the powerful, pale-skinned "N30 Ag3nts".

In Chapter 1.2, Morpheus states that though the machines never returned Neo's physical remains (Neo's body in the real world) to Zion, they did not "recycle" them; a reference to the first film, in which Morpheus tells Neo that the machines liquefy deceased occupants of the Matrix to provide organic sustenance for its living inhabitants. This would be the driving force behind Morpheus' descent into fanatical terrorism against the system in an attempt to force the machines to reveal Neo's fate; ultimately leading to his assassination.

The subject of Neo then fell to the side lines for other struggles; until the arrival of the Oligarchs in Chapter 9. The original intruder, Halborn, was notably intrigued by the life of the One and was personally shocked about the implications of Neo's ability to affect Machines outside of the simulation had on his search for what he called the "Biological Interface Program".

After Halborn's removal in Chapter 10, little more was questioned until the revelation of the Trinity project, originally headed by the Oracle, in Chapter 12. It was revealed that both Neo and Trinity were actually the culmination of decades of machine research into translating human DNA perfectly into machine code; allowing them to interface directly with technology without the need for simulated interfaces.

=== The Matrix Resurrections ===
60 years after the events of The Matrix Revolutions, Neo is now a video game designer and the creator of a video game series simply known as The Matrix, which uses Neo's previous memories in the plot. Neo is 57 years old in the Matrix program, but 60 years have passed in the real world, making Neo 97 years old. Neo once again lives under the alias Thomas Anderson and although he does not look old, others see him as an aging man with long gray hair. His love, Trinity, who lives under the name "Tiffany", is married to a man named Chad and has three children. Neo has a existential crisis, so his therapist has prescribed him the blue pills. Neo's boss approaches him with an idea to make a fourth Matrix game. However, the more Neo and his crew make the game, the less blue pills he takes and he eventually stops taking them. One day, a man known as "Morpheus" approaches Neo with the red pill, but agents and a police force storm the building where Neo works in order to kill Morpheus, who is revealed as a rogue agent who opened his mind and decided to help Neo destroy the Matrix (and has taken on the identity of the original Morpheus, who has since died). Morpheus kills several police officers while Neo's boss picks up an officer's gun and once again becomes Agent Smith.

The attack was revealed to be a dream, and Neo was still in his therapist's room. A drunk Neo later goes on a rooftop and questions his existence. However, a woman with blue hair and a trench coat appears besides him. The woman introduces herself as Bugs, who tries to reopen his mind through a White Rabbit tattoo. Bugs then shows Neo her crew in an abandoned theater. Morpheus, part of Bugs' group once again, offers a blue pill and a red pill to Neo, who takes the red pill. The team then "unplugs" Neo and with the help of a friendly machine, who was hacked, he is revived in the real world inside Bugs' ship, the Mnemosyne.

In the real world, after Morpheus helps Neo regain his memories and fighting style, the Mnemosyne goes to Io, the last human city led by Niobe. Niobe reveals that, when Zion was nearly destroyed by the machines in another war, she and the rest of the inhabitants escaped and made a new city with the help of some machines. After sixty years, Niobe does not trust Neo, but lets the Mnemosyne crew destroy the Matrix with the help of Sati, the sentient program who helped Neo in Revolutions. In the Matrix, Neo's therapist, named the Analyst, a program designed to study the human psyche and the new leader of both the Matrix and the machines, explains that after Neo and Trinity's deaths, he was able to resurrect them to study them. He found that suppressing their memories but keeping them close to one another made the Matrix more power-efficient and more resistant to the anomalies that caused the previous iterations to fail. However, Neo's liberation destabilized the system and triggered a fail-safe to reboot the Matrix. The Analyst stalled the reboot by convincing his superiors that threatening to kill Trinity would get Neo to voluntarily return to his pod. The Analyst then taunts Neo in the Matrix with bullet time by threatening to kill Trinity with a pistol, and then forces Neo to meet him in a café that he and Trinity had frequented. The crew then uses that opportunity to unplug Trinity. At the café, surrounded by riot officers, Neo distracts the Analyst while the team unplugs Trinity. They successfully unplug her, and Trinity gets her memories back and helps Neo fight the officers. Eventually, Smith fights the two, but gets away. In a final attempt to get rid of Neo and Trinity, the Analyst activates the Swarm, which forces many people to try to kill Bugs' team. The team survives, and when Neo and Trinity are cornered by police helicopters, they then decide to fly, which indeed does happen. The Analyst is defeated, and Neo and Trinity finally rekindle their romance and remake the Matrix in their own image.

== Casting choices ==
Tom Cruise, Johnny Depp, Brad Pitt, Nicolas Cage, Brandon Lee and Leonardo DiCaprio were approached for the role. Will Smith, who turned down the role to make Wild Wild West, later said he regretted the decision. Ewan McGregor was said to have been sent the script to the movie, but later turned it down and moved on to do Star Wars: Episode I – The Phantom Menace. Sandra Bullock was asked by the film's producers to star in the film, thus changing the gender of the character to female, only to receive a negative answer by Bullock.

== Powers and abilities ==
Neo has carried, since his conception, the Matrix's source code known as the Prime Program. This gives him the ability to freely manipulate the simulated reality of the Matrix, similar to the authority a system administrator has over a given system. He manifests these abilities as various superhuman powers.

The power Neo exhibits most often is akin to telekinesis in the Matrix. In that, he seems capable of manipulating any object in the Matrix through will alone. By focusing this ability upon himself, he can fly at amazing speeds and jump great distances. Whilst his speed is never specified, he flies from the Merovingian's mountain manor to the highway "500 miles due south" in a very short time. It can thus be extrapolated that if it took him roughly 10 minutes to fly from the château in the mountains to the freeway in the Mega City, he would have to have been flying at around 3,000 mph, or just shy of Mach 4. However, his speed of flight is further exemplified by his ability to escape explosions, and the sonic boom left in his wake has the power to overturn rows of heavy vehicles and reap massive destruction, indicating he can probably fly much faster than Mach 4 when pressed. He has used this ability multiple times to stop several bullets in mid flight, first against the Agents and again against the Merovingian.

In addition to his abilities, Neo possesses superhuman strength and agility, and is near-invulnerable to most attacks. Although his physical endurance is immense, Neo can still be harmed or killed, as evidenced by an injury that Neo suffers while blocking a sword attack with his bare hand. His endurance is also finite: when confronted by masses of Smith clones in the second film, Neo was forced to escape rather than continue fighting though he easily overpowered at least 40 Smith clones and threw about 50 off him, and upon being disconnected from the Matrix, he appeared exhausted and winded. His reflexes are great enough to dodge bullets. Neo's strength and speed level have never been accurately measured; he is known to be capable of Mach 8, at least, and Mach 10 under stress, but his upper limit has never been shown. In the third movie, Neo has reached his (apparent) full strength; he is capable of withstanding a direct physical punch from the Smith enhanced by the Oracle's power, and is also able to hold his own in a prolonged fight (though his endurance is not without limit; he can fight this Smith to a standstill, but not defeat him).

In the real world, like the other rebels, Neo does not display any of the aforementioned abilities. According to the Oracle, "The power of The One extends beyond the Matrix. It reaches from here all the way back to where it came from." Apparently because of his status as The One, he has a direct connection to the Source in the real world, and can therefore affect everything connected to it, including Sentinels, although the first use of this ability overwhelms him and he falls into a coma as his mind somehow plugs into the Matrix without a physical connection. Neo also begins to perceive everything connected to the Source, including the Machine City itself, as silhouettes of golden light. This ability becomes beneficial after he is blinded in the fight against Smith/Bane, thus he is able to see Smith/Bane and kill him.

In The Matrix Resurrections, the resurrected Neo at first doesn't have access to his powers, although he slowly regains them over time, particularly during his fight with Smith. Neo is now able to create powerful telekinetic shockwaves, particularly when touching Trinity, and while he can still stop bullets, it appears to take him more effort. At one point, he telekinetically deflects a missile into a helicopter and shields himself from Smith smashing a porcelain sink down on his head. However, he is unable to fly while trying to escape from the Analyst's forces after reuniting with Trinity or after jumping off of a roof. Instead, Trinity develops the ability to fly and takes them both to safety. Neo appears to have regained his full powers by the end of the movie as he and Trinity fly off together after confronting the Analyst.

=== Martial arts styles ===
Neo uses a variety of martial arts styles across the four Matrix movies. In the first film, Neo's skill in martial arts was shown being downloaded into his brain, which granted combat abilities equivalent to a martial artist with decades of experience. As part of the preparation for the movie, Yuen Woo-ping had Keanu Reeves undertake four months of martial arts training in a variety of different styles. Jujutsu, taekwondo, drunken boxing, American Kenpo Karate and kung fu are some of what Neo learns as part of his computerized combat training. But in the real world, Neo does not display any of the aforementioned martial arts skills.
