= The Matrix (franchise) =

American media franchise

- The franchise's logo featured throughout its licensed merchandise
- Created by: The Wachowskis (Note: The films' credits listed "The Wachowski Brothers" as the writers and directors.)
- Original work: The Matrix (1999)
- Owners: Warner Bros. Entertainment; Alcon Entertainment (Note: Acquired the rights to the franchise in June 2025 after Village Roadshow filed for bankruptcy and sold off its entire film library to Alcon, namely including The Matrix. Distribution and production rights remain with Warner Bros. Entertainment.)
- Years: 1999–present

Print publications
- Comics: The Matrix Comics Series 1–3 (1999–2003); The Matrix Comics Volumes 1 and 2 (2003–2004); The Matrix Comics: 20th Anniversary Edition (2019)
- Magazine: The Matrix Online: The Official Magazine (2005)

Films and television
- Films: The Matrix (1999); The Matrix Reloaded (2003); The Matrix Revolutions (2003); The Matrix Resurrections (2021)
- Direct-to-video: The Matrix Revisited (2001); The Animatrix (2003)

Games
- Video games: Enter the Matrix (2003); The Matrix Online (2005–2009); The Matrix: Path of Neo (2005); The Matrix Awakens (2021)

Audio
- Soundtracks: The Matrix: Original Motion Picture Score; The Matrix: Music from the Motion Picture; The Matrix Reloaded: Limited Edition; The Matrix Reloaded: The Album; The Animatrix: The Album; The Matrix Revolutions: Limited Edition; The Matrix Revolutions: Music from the Motion Picture; The Matrix Resurrections: Original Motion Picture Soundtrack

The Matrix is an American cyberpunk media franchise consisting of four feature films, beginning with The Matrix (1999) and continuing with three sequels, Reloaded (2003), Revolutions (2003), and Resurrections (2021). The first three films were written and directed by the Wachowskis and produced by Joel Silver. The screenplay for the fourth film was written by Lana Wachowski, David Mitchell and Aleksandar Hemon, was directed by Lana Wachowski, and was produced by Grant Hill, James McTeigue, and Lana Wachowski. The franchise is owned by Warner Bros., which distributed the films along with Village Roadshow Pictures. The latter, along with Silver Pictures, are the two production companies that worked on the first three films.

The series features a cyberpunk story of the technological fall of humanity, in which the creation of artificial intelligence led the way to a race of powerful and self-aware machines that imprisoned humans in a neural interactive simulation — the Matrix — to be farmed as a power source. Occasionally, some of the prisoners manage to break free from the system and, considered a threat, become pursued by the artificial intelligence both inside and outside of it. The films focus on the plight of Neo (Keanu Reeves), Trinity (Carrie-Anne Moss), and Morpheus (Laurence Fishburne and Yahya Abdul-Mateen II) trying to free humanity from the system while pursued by its guardians, such as Agent Smith (Hugo Weaving, Abdul-Mateen II, and Jonathan Groff). The story references numerous norms, particularly philosophical, religious, and spiritual ideas, but also the dilemma of choice vs. control, the brain in a vat thought experiment, messianism, and the concepts of interdependency and love. Influences include the principles of mythology, anime, and Hong Kong action films (particularly "heroic bloodshed" and martial arts movies). The film series is notable for its use of heavily choreographed action sequences and "bullet time" slow-motion effects, which revolutionized action films to come.

The characters and setting of the films are further explored in other media set in the same fictional universe, including animation, comics, and video games. The comic "Bits and Pieces of Information" and the Animatrix short film The Second Renaissance act as prequels to the films, explaining how the franchise's setting came to be. The video game Enter the Matrix connects the story of the Animatrix short "Final Flight of the Osiris" with the events of Reloaded, while the online video game The Matrix Online was a direct sequel to Revolutions. These were typically written, commissioned, or approved by the Wachowskis.

The first film was an important critical and commercial success, winning four Academy Awards, introducing popular culture symbols such as the red pill and blue pill, and influencing action filmmaking. For those reasons, it has been added to the National Film Registry for preservation. Its first sequel was also a commercial success, becoming the highest-grossing R-rated film in history, until it was surpassed by Deadpool in 2016. As of 2006, the franchise has generated US$3 billion in revenue. A fourth film, The Matrix Resurrections, was released on December 22, 2021, with Lana Wachowski producing, cowriting, and directing and Reeves and Moss reprising their roles. A fifth film is currently in development with Drew Goddard set to write and direct with Lana Wachowski executive producing.

== Setting ==
The series depicts a future in which Earth is dominated by a race of self-aware machines that was spawned from the creation of artificial intelligence early in the 21st century. At one point conflict arose between humanity and machines, and the machines rebelled against their creators. Humans attempted to block out the machines' source of solar power by covering the sky in thick, stormy clouds. A massive war emerged between the two adversaries which ended with the machines victorious, capturing humanity. Having lost their definite source of energy, the machines devised a way to extract the human body's bioelectric and thermal energies by enclosing people in pods, while their minds are controlled by cybernetic implants connecting them to a simulated reality called The Matrix.

The virtual reality world simulated by the Matrix resembles human civilization around the turn of the 21st century (this time period was chosen because it is supposedly the pinnacle of human civilization). The environment inside the Matrix – called a "residual self-image" (the mental projection of a digital self) – is practically indistinguishable from reality (although scenes set within the Matrix are presented on-screen with a green tint to the footage, and a general bias towards the color green), and the vast majority of humans connected to it are unaware of its true nature. Most of the central characters in the series are able to gain superhuman abilities within the Matrix by taking advantage of their understanding of its true nature to manipulate its virtual physical laws. The films take place both inside the Matrix and outside of it, in the real world; the parts that take place in the Matrix are set in a vast Western megacity.

The virtual world is first introduced in The Matrix. The short comic "Bits and Pieces of Information" and the Animatrix short film The Second Renaissance show how the initial conflict between humanity and machines came about, and how and why the Matrix was first developed. Its history and purpose are further explained in The Matrix Reloaded. In The Matrix Revolutions a new status quo is established in the Matrix's place in humankind and machines' conflict. This was further explored in The Matrix Online, a now-defunct MMORPG.

== Films ==
Film	U.S. release date	Directed by	Written by	Produced by
The Matrix	March 31, 1999	The Wachowskis	The Wachowskis	Joel Silver
The Matrix Reloaded	May 15, 2003	The Wachowskis	The Wachowskis	Joel Silver
The Matrix Revolutions	November 5, 2003	The Wachowskis	The Wachowskis	Joel Silver
The Matrix Resurrections	December 22, 2021	Lana Wachowski	Lana Wachowski, David Mitchell & Aleksandar Hemon	Grant Hill, Lana Wachowski & James McTeigue

=== Future ===
During production of the original trilogy, the Wachowskis told their close collaborators that, "at that time they had no intention of making another Matrix film after The Matrix Revolutions". In February 2015, in promotion interviews for Jupiter Ascending, Lilly Wachowski called a return to The Matrix "a particularly repelling idea in these times", noting studios' tendencies to "greenlight" sequels, reboots, and adaptations, in preference to original material. Meanwhile, Lana Wachowski, in addressing rumors about a potential reboot, stated that "...they had not heard anything, but she believed that the studio might be looking to replace them". At various times, Keanu Reeves and Hugo Weaving each confirmed their interest and willingness to reprise their roles in potential future installments of the Matrix films, with the stipulation that the Wachowskis were involved in the creative and production process. These comments were made prior to the announcement in August 2019 that Lana Wachowski would direct a fourth Matrix film ultimately titled The Matrix Resurrections.

Following the release of Resurrections, producer James McTeigue said that there were no plans for further Matrix films, though he believed that the film's open ending meant that could change in the future. In April 2024, it was announced that Warner Bros. was developing a new installment in the franchise with Drew Goddard attached to write and direct following a successful pitch with studio executives. It will mark the first installment to not be directed by either Wachowski sister although Lana will serve as an executive producer.

In November 2026, Puck reported that the Wachowskis were attempting to reclaim the rights to the series from Warner Bros., which could revert to them as early as 2029.

==== Other projects ====
In March 2017, The Hollywood Reporter wrote that Warner Bros. was in the early stages of developing a re-launch of the franchise. Consideration was given to producing a Matrix television series, but was dismissed as the studio opted to pursue negotiations with Zak Penn in writing a treatment for a new film, with Michael B. Jordan eyed for the lead role. According to the article, the Wachowskis were not involved at that point. In response to the report, Penn refuted all statements regarding a reboot, remake, or continuation, remarking that he was working on stories set in the pre-established continuity.

Potential plotlines being considered by Warner Bros. Pictures included a prequel film about a young Morpheus, or an alternate storyline with a focus on one of his descendants. By April 2018, Penn described the script as "being at a nascent stage". Later, in September 2019, Jordan addressed the rumors of his involvement by saying he was "flattered", but without making a definitive statement. In October 2019, Penn confirmed the script he wrote is set within an earlier time period than the first three films in the franchise.

== Cast and crew ==
=== Cast ===
List indicators

This section includes characters who will appear or have appeared in two or more installments in the series.

- An empty grey cell indicates the character was not in the film, or that the character's official presence has not yet been confirmed.
- ^{A} indicates an appearance through archival footage or audio.
- ^{E} indicates an appearance not included in the theatrical cut.
- ^{M} indicates an appearance in onscreen movie footage.
- ^{O} indicates an older version of the character.
- ^{U} indicates an uncredited appearance.
- ^{V} indicates a voice-only role.
- ^{Y} indicates a younger version of the character.

Character	Films				Video games				Animated film
Character	The Matrix	The Matrix Reloaded	The Matrix Revolutions	The Matrix Resurrections	Enter the Matrix	The Matrix Online	The Matrix: Path of Neo	The Matrix Awakens	The Animatrix
Character	1999	2003		2021	2003	2005		2021	2003
==== Zion / Io ====
Neo Thomas A. Anderson	Keanu Reeves	Keanu Reeves	Keanu Reeves	Keanu Reeves	Keanu Reeves	Appeared	Andrew Bowen	Keanu Reeves	Keanu Reeves
Neo Thomas A. Anderson	Keanu Reeves	Keanu Reeves	Keanu Reeves	Steven Roy^{O}	Keanu Reeves	Appeared	Andrew Bowen	Keanu Reeves	Keanu Reeves
Neo Thomas A. Anderson	Keanu Reeves	Keanu Reeves	Keanu Reeves	James McTeigue^{O}	Keanu Reeves	Appeared	Andrew Bowen	Keanu Reeves	Keanu Reeves
Trinity Tiffany	Carrie-Anne Moss	Carrie-Anne Moss	Carrie-Anne Moss	Carrie-Anne Moss	Carrie-Anne Moss	Appeared	Jennifer Hale	Carrie-Anne Moss	Carrie-Anne Moss
Trinity Tiffany	Carrie-Anne Moss	Carrie-Anne Moss	Carrie-Anne Moss	Sarah McTeigue^{O}	Carrie-Anne Moss	Appeared	Jennifer Hale	Carrie-Anne Moss	Carrie-Anne Moss
Morpheus	Laurence Fishburne	Laurence Fishburne	Laurence Fishburne	Yahya Abdul-Mateen II	Laurence Fishburne	Laurence Fishburne	Laurence Fishburne	Laurence Fishburne^{A}^{M}	
Morpheus	Laurence Fishburne	Laurence Fishburne	Laurence Fishburne	Laurence Fishburne^{A}^{M}	Laurence Fishburne	Laurence Fishburne	Laurence Fishburne	Laurence Fishburne^{A}^{M}	
Niobe		Jada Pinkett Smith	Jada Pinkett Smith	Jada Pinkett Smith	Jada Pinkett Smith	Gina Torres	Kimberly Brooks		
Link		Harold Perrineau	Harold Perrineau		Harold Perrineau	Harold Perrineau	Keith Ferguson		
Cdr. Lock		Harry Lennix	Harry Lennix		Harry Lennix	Harry Lennix			
The Kid Michael Karl Popper		Clayton Watson	Clayton Watson		Clayton Watson				Clayton Watson
Cllr. Hamann		Anthony Zerbe	Anthony Zerbe		Anthony Zerbe				
Cpt. Roland		David Roberts	David Roberts		David Roberts				
Bane		Ian Bliss	Ian Bliss				Gideon Emery		
Zee		Nona Gaye	Nona Gaye						
Cpt. Mifune		Nathaniel Lees	Nathaniel Lees						
Officer Wirtz		Genevieve O'Reilly	Genevieve O'Reilly						
Cis		Appeared					Hedy Burress		Hedy Burress
Thadeus					Kevin Michael Richardson				Kevin Michael Richardson
Duo							Phil LaMarr		Phil LaMarr
==== Agents ====
Agent Smith	Hugo Weaving	Hugo Weaving	Hugo Weaving	Jonathan Groff	Hugo Weaving	Appeared	Christopher Corey Smith		Matt McKenzie
Agent Smith	Hugo Weaving	Ian Bliss	Ian Bliss	Yahya Abdul-Mateen II	Hugo Weaving	Appeared	Christopher Corey Smith		Matt McKenzie
Agent Smith	Hugo Weaving	Ian Bliss	Ian Bliss	Hugo Weaving^{A}^{M}	Hugo Weaving	Appeared	Gideon Emery		Matt McKenzie
Agent Jones	Robert Taylor			Stephen Dunlevy			James M. Connor		Kevin Michael Richardson
Agent Brown	Paul Goddard						Michael Gough		Matt McKenzie
Agent Johnson		Daniel Bernhardt		Daniel Bernhardt^{E}	Daniel Bernhardt		Fred Tatasciore		
Agent Jackson		David A. Kilde			David A. Kilde		Stephen Stanton		
Agent Thompson		Matt McColm			Matt McColm		Robin Atkin Downes		
Agent White				Amadei Weiland			Appeared		
==== Programs ====
The Oracle	Gloria Foster	Gloria Foster	Mary Alice	Gloria Foster^{A}^{M}	Mary Alice	Mary Alice			
Woman in Red	Fiona Johnson			Dani Swan					
Seraph		Collin Chou	Collin Chou		Collin Chou	Collin Chou	Michael Gough		
The Merovingian		Lambert Wilson	Lambert Wilson	Lambert Wilson	Lambert Wilson	Robin Atkin Downes			
Persephone		Monica Bellucci	Monica Bellucci		Monica Bellucci	Monica Bellucci			
Keymaker		Randall Duk Kim			Randall Duk Kim		Peter Renaday		
The Architect		Helmut Bakaitis	Helmut Bakaitis						
Rama Kandra		Bernard White	Bernard White						
Sati			Tanveer K. Atwal	Priyanka Chopra Jonas		Tanveer K. Atwal			
Sati			Tanveer K. Atwal	Tanveer K. Atwal^{A}^{M}		Tanveer K. Atwal			
Trainman			Bruce Spence		Bruce Spence				
Io				Appeared				Felicia Simone	
The Analyst				Neil Patrick Harris					

=== Crew ===
The following is a list of crew members who have participated in the making of the Matrix film series.

Title	Executive producers	Director(s) of photography	Editor	Composer(s)
The Matrix	Erwin Stoff, Bruce Berman, Andrew Mason, The Wachowskis & Barrie M. Osborne	Bill Pope	Zach Staenberg	Don Davis
The Matrix Reloaded	Grant Hill, Bruce Berman, Andrew Mason & The Wachowskis	Bill Pope	Zach Staenberg	Don Davis
The Matrix Revolutions	Grant Hill, Bruce Berman, Andrew Mason & The Wachowskis	Bill Pope	Zach Staenberg	Don Davis
The Matrix Resurrections	Jesse Ehrman, Bruce Berman, Terry Needham, Garrett Grant, Michael Salven & Karin Wachowski	John Toll & Daniele Massaccesi	Joseph Jett Sally	Tom Tykwer & Johnny Klimek

== Production ==
The Matrix series includes four feature films. The first three were written and directed by the Wachowskis and produced by Joel Silver, starring Keanu Reeves, Laurence Fishburne, Carrie-Anne Moss and Hugo Weaving. The series was filmed in Australia and began with 1999's The Matrix, which depicts the recruitment of hacker Neo into humanity's rebellion against sentient machines.

The film's mainstream success had backed up the initial idea of making a trilogy. The sequels, The Matrix Reloaded and The Matrix Revolutions, were filmed simultaneously during one shoot (under the project codename "The Burly Man"), and released in two parts in 2003. They tell the story of the impending attack on the human enclave of Zion by a vast machine army. Neo also learns more about the history of the Matrix and his role as The One. The sequels also incorporate more ambitious action scenes and visual effects.

== Reception ==
=== Box office performance ===
The Matrix was highly successful, earning over $460 million worldwide on a modest budget of $63 million. The sequels had a much larger budget of $150 million each; Reloaded was also a big commercial success, earning almost $742 million worldwide and becoming the highest-grossing R-rated film in history, a title which it held for 13 years until it was surpassed by the film Deadpool; Revolutions had the world's first simultaneous release across major cities all over the world, which for the first time in history included both a release in China, and a release in IMAX theaters. Its five-day opening at $204 million broke the previous record, but ultimately the film made $427 million, a little less than the original.

Film	U.S. release date	Box office gross (Domestic)	Box office gross (International)	Box office gross (Worldwide)	Budget	Ref(s)
The Matrix	March 31, 1999	$172,076,928	$295,145,800	$467,222,728	$63 million	
The Matrix Reloaded	May 15, 2003	$281,576,461	$460,271,476	$741,847,937	$150 million	
The Matrix Revolutions	November 5, 2003	$139,313,948	$288,030,377	$427,344,325	$150 million	
The Matrix Resurrections	December 22, 2021	$37,686,805	$119,610,720	$157,297,525	$190 million	
Total		$630,654,142	$1,163,058,373	$1,793,712,515	$553 million	

=== Critical and public response ===
The Matrix and The Matrix Reloaded received positive reviews, the critical response to The Matrix Revolutions was more negative. One complaint was that Revolutions did not give answers to the questions raised in Reloaded.

Film	Rotten Tomatoes	Metacritic	CinemaScore
The Matrix	83% (207 reviews)	73 (35 reviews)	A−
The Matrix Reloaded	74% (246 reviews)	62 (40 reviews)	B+
The Animatrix	89% (18 reviews)	—N/a	—N/a
The Matrix Revolutions	34% (219 reviews)	47 (41 reviews)	B
The Matrix Resurrections	63% (363 reviews)	63 (57 reviews)	B−

=== Legal claims ===
In April 2003, Sophia Stewart filed a legal complaint in the United States District Court for the Central District of California alleging that the idea of The Matrix (and the 1984 film The Terminator) were plagiarized from her own film treatment titled "The Third Eye". The court allowed the lawsuit to move forward in 2005, but Stewart did not attend the deposition. In a 53-page ruling, Judge Margaret Morrow dismissed the case, stating that Stewart and her attorneys "had not entered any evidence to bolster its key claims or demonstrated any striking similarity between her work and the accused directors' films." In August 2014, Stewart successfully sued her lawyers because they "failed to provide legal services to Ms. Stewart in the California case, and thereby breached the Contract. For example, [her lawyers] failed timely to respond to discovery requests or serve discovery requests on the California defendants, failed to depose key witnesses or develop admissible evidence, failed to deny requests for admission, and failed to respond timely to the California defendants’ motion for summary judgment." "Ms. Stewart did not appear for [the 2005] deposition, ultimately twice failing to appear for her deposition; and both times unknowingly, as her attorneys never advised her of the depositions." Stewart was awarded damages totaling $316,280.62. Despite the ruling, the case became the subject of "Internet legend", with many sources claiming Stewart had actually won the lawsuit.

In 2013, Thomas Althouse filed suit in California federal court alleging that ideas for the sequels The Matrix Reloaded and The Matrix Revolutions came from a screenplay he wrote called The Immortals. In a summary judgement for the defendants, Judge R. Gary Klausner stated "The basic premises of The Matrix Trilogy and The Immortals are so different that it would be unreasonable to find their plots substantially similar."

== Influences and interpretations ==
What we were trying to achieve with the story overall was a shift, the same kind of shift that happens for Neo, that Neo goes from being in this sort of cocooned and programmed world, to having to participate in the construction of meaning to his life. And we were like, "Well, can the audience go through the three movies and experience something similar to what the main character experiences?"

So the first movie is sort of typical in its approach. The second movie is deconstructionist, and it assaults all of the things that you thought to be true in the first movie, and so people get very upset, and they're like "Stop attacking me!" in the same way that people get upset with deconstructionist philosophy. I mean, Derrida and Foucault, these people upset us. And then the third movie is the most ambiguous, because it asks you to actually participate in the construction of meaning.

— Lana Wachowski, Movie City News, October 13, 2012

The Matrix films make numerous references to films and literature, and to historical myths and philosophy, including Buddhism, Vedanta, Advaita Hinduism, Christianity, Messianism, Judaism, Gnosticism, existentialism, obscurantism, and nihilism. The films' premise resembles Plato's Allegory of the cave, René Descartes's evil demon, Kant's reflections on the Phenomenon versus the Ding an sich, Zhuangzi's "Zhuangzi dreamed he was a butterfly", Marxist social theory and the brain in a vat thought experiment. Many references to Jean Baudrillard's 1981 treatise Simulacra and Simulation appear in the first film. Baudrillard himself considered this a misrepresentation, although Lana Wachowski claims the point the reference was making was misunderstood. There are similarities to cyberpunk works such as the 1984 book Neuromancer by William Gibson, who has described The Matrix as "arguably the ultimate 'cyberpunk' artifact".

Japanese director Mamoru Oshii's 1995 film Ghost in the Shell was a strong influence. Producer Joel Silver has stated that the Wachowskis first described their intentions for The Matrix by showing him that anime and saying, "We wanna do that for real." Mitsuhisa Ishikawa of Production I.G, which produced Ghost in the Shell, noted that the anime's high-quality visuals were a strong source of inspiration for the Wachowskis. He also commented, "... cyberpunk films are very difficult to describe to a third person. I'd imagine that The Matrix is the kind of film that was very difficult to draw up a written proposal for to take to film studios." He stated that since Ghost in the Shell had gained recognition in America, the Wachowskis used it as a "promotional tool". Similarities to the 1985 anime film Megazone 23 have also been noticed, but the Wachowskis stated they have never seen it.

Reviewers have commented on similarities between The Matrix and other late-1990s films such as Strange Days, Dark City, and The Truman Show. The Wachowskis stated Dark City had no influence on the franchise, but commented about it and The Truman Show that they thought it was "very strange that Australia came to have three films associated with it that were all about the nature of reality." Comparisons have also been made to Grant Morrison's comic series The Invisibles; Morrison believes that the Wachowskis essentially plagiarized their work to create the film. The Wachowskis responded that they enjoy the comic, but did not use it for inspiration. In addition, the similarity of the films' central concept to a device in the long-running series Doctor Who has also been noted. As in the film, the Matrix of that series (introduced in the 1976 serial The Deadly Assassin) is a massive computer system which one enters using a device connecting to the head, allowing users to see representations of the real world and change its laws of physics; but if killed there, they will die in reality.

The first Matrix film features numerous references to the "White Rabbit", the "Rabbit Hole" and mirrors, referring to Lewis Carroll's novels Alice's Adventures in Wonderland (1865) and Through the Looking-Glass (1871). Matrixism is a new religious movement inspired by the trilogy. Adam Possamai, a sociologist of religion, describes these types of religions/spiritualities as hyper-real religions due to their eclectic mix of religion/spirituality with elements of popular culture and their connection to the fluid social structures of late capitalism. There is some debate about whether followers of Matrixism are indeed serious about their practice; however, the religion (real or otherwise) has received attention in the media.

Following the Wachowskis' coming out as transgender women some years after the release of the films, the first film and the pill analogy have also been analyzed in the context of the Wachowskis' transgender experiences. In this case, taking the red pill and living out of the Matrix symbolizes exploring one's own gender identity, starting the transition and coming out as transgender, as opposed to a continued life in the closet. In 2016, Lilly Wachowski acknowledged this analysis by calling it "a cool thing because it's an excellent reminder that art is never static".

== Home media ==
The Ultimate Matrix Collection DVD cover

In 2004, Warner Home Video released The Ultimate Matrix Collection, a 10-disc set of the films on DVD. It included the trilogy of films, The Animatrix, and six discs of additional material, including the documentary film The Matrix Revisited, the live-action footage shot for Enter the Matrix, and a promotional compilation of The Matrix Online. For this release, The Matrix was remastered under the supervision of the Wachowskis and the trilogy's cinematographer, Bill Pope, to improve its picture quality and make its color timing closer to that of its sequels. At the request of the Wachowskis, as they explain in a written statement that accompanies the boxset, each of the three films is accompanied by two audio commentaries, one by philosophers who liked the films, and another by critics who did not, with the intention that viewers use them as reference points to form their own opinion. The compilation includes 35 hours of bonus material, but some of the extras from earlier, standalone, releases are missing. A Limited Edition of The Ultimate Matrix Collection was also released. It encases the ten discs plus a resin bust of Neo inside an acrylic glass box.

The Ultimate Matrix Collection was later also released on HD DVD (5 discs) and Blu-ray (6 discs) in 2007 and 2008, respectively. The HD DVD release added a picture-in-picture video commentary to the three films and the extras that were missing from the previous DVD compilation. The Blu-ray release presented The Animatrix in high definition for the first time. A pared-down set dubbed The Complete Matrix Trilogy was also released on HD DVD and Blu-ray (3 discs each), which dropped The Animatrix and some of the special features.

The Ultra HD Blu-ray release of The Matrix Trilogy came out in 2018 (9 discs), and presented the trilogy in 4K resolution and high-dynamic-range video, remastered from the original camera negative and supervised by Bill Pope. In this release, The Matrix is presented with a color grade that reportedly comes closer to its theatrical presentation than any of the previous home video releases. The set also includes standard Blu-ray copies of the films sourced from the new 4K master, but is missing The Animatrix and some special features.

== Other media and merchandising ==
By August 2000, The Matrix DVD had sold over three million copies in United States, becoming the best-selling of all time. By November 2003, The Matrix franchise had generated $677 million from VHS and DVD sales, $162 million from the video game Enter the Matrix (2003), $37 million from The Matrix Reloaded: The Album soundtrack sales, and $3.5 million from licensed merchandise sales. As of 2006, the franchise has grossed $3 billion from all sources worldwide.

=== Animation ===
In acknowledgment of the strong influence of Japanese Anime on the Matrix series, The Animatrix was produced in 2003 to coincide with the release of The Matrix Reloaded. This is a collection of nine animated short films intended to further flesh out the concepts, history, characters, and setting of the series. The objective of The Animatrix project was to give other writers and directors the opportunity to lend their voices and interpretation to the Matrix universe; the Wachowskis conceived of and oversaw the process, and they wrote four of the segments themselves, although they were given to other directors to execute. Many of the segments were produced by notable figures from the world of Japanese animation. Four of the films were originally released on the series' official website, one was shown in cinemas with Dreamcatcher, one was shown on MTV, MTV2, MTV3, MTV4, and Syfi, and the others first appeared with the DVD release of all nine shorts shortly after the release of The Matrix Reloaded.

=== Video games ===
On May 15, 2003, the game Enter the Matrix was released in North America concurrently with The Matrix Reloaded. The first of three video games related to the films, it told a story running parallel to The Matrix Reloaded and featured scenes that were shot during the filming of The Matrix Reloaded and The Matrix Revolutions.

Two more The Matrix video games were released in 2005. The MMORPG The Matrix Online continued the story beyond The Matrix Revolutions, while The Matrix: Path of Neo allowed players to control Neo in scenes from the film trilogy. The Matrix Online was shut down in 2009.

The Matrix official website also provided several original Adobe Flash-based browser games.

An interactive technology demonstration, titled The Matrix Awakens, was released on December 9, 2021.

=== Comic books ===
The Matrix Comics is a set of comics and short stories based on the series and written and illustrated by figures from the comics industry; one of the comics was written by the Wachowskis and illustrated by the films' concept artist Geof Darrow. The comics and stories were originally presented for free on the Matrix series' website between 1999 and 2003. One of them was printed in 1999 to be given away at theaters as a promotional item for The Matrix, but Warner Bros. recalled it due to its mature content. Most of them were later republished by the Wachowskis' Burlyman Entertainment, along with some new stories and updates with color to some of the existing ones, in two printed trade paperback volumes in 2003 and 2004 and a deluxe hardcover twentieth-anniversary edition in 2019.

=== Screensaver ===
The Matrix official website provided a free screensaver for Microsoft Windows and Mac OS X, which simulates the falling "Matrix digital rain" of the films. The screensaver was reported to have a password security problem. The "Matrix digital rain" also inspired the creation of many unofficial screensavers.

== Books ==
=== Official ===
- The Art of the Matrix by various (Newmarket Press, 2000) ISBN 978-1557044051
- The Matrix Shooting Script by the Wachowskis (with introduction by William Gibson) (Newmarket Press, 2001) ISBN 978-1557044907
- The Matrix Comics, Vol. 1 by various (Burlyman Entertainment, 2003) ISBN 1-932700-00-5
- The Matrix Comics, Vol. 2 by various (Burlyman Entertainment, 2004) ISBN 1-932700-09-9
- Enter the Matrix: Official Strategy Guide by Doug Walsh (BradyGames, 2003) ISBN 978-0744002713
- The Matrix Online: Prima Official Game Guide (Prima Games, 2005) ISBN 978-0761549437
- The Matrix: Path of Neo: Official Strategy Guide (BradyGames, 2005) ISBN 978-0744006582
- The Matrix Comics: 20th Anniversary Edition by various (Burlyman Entertainment, 2019) ISBN 978-1932700572

=== Unofficial ===
- Jacking In to the Matrix Franchise: Cultural Reception and Interpretation by Matthew Kapell and William G. Doty (Continuum International, 2004) ISBN 0-8264-1587-3
- Taking the Red Pill: Science, Philosophy and Religion in "The Matrix" by Glenn Yeffeth (Summersdale, 2003) ISBN 1-84024-377-5
- Matrix Warrior: Being the One by Jake Horsley (Gollancz, 2003) ISBN 0-575-07527-9
- The "Matrix" and Philosophy: Welcome to the Desert of the Real by William Irwin (Open Court, 2002) ISBN 0-8126-9502-X
- More Matrix and Philosophy by William Irwin (Open Court, 2005) ISBN 0-8126-9572-0
- Like a Splinter in Your Mind: The Philosophy Behind the "Matrix" Trilogy by Matt Lawrence (Blackwell, 2004) ISBN 1-4051-2524-1
- The Matrix (British Film Institute, 2004) ISBN 1-84457-045-2
- Matrix Revelations: A Thinking Fan's Guide to the Matrix Trilogy by Steve Couch (Damaris, 2003) ISBN 1-904753-01-9
- Beyond the Matrix: Revolutions and Revelations by Stephen Faller (Chalice Press, 2004) ISBN 0-8272-0235-0
- The "Matrix" Trilogy: Cyberpunk Reloaded by Stacy Gillis (Wallflower Press, 2005) ISBN 1-904764-32-0
- Exegesis of the Matrix by Peter B. Lloyd (Whole-Being Books, 2003) ISBN 1-902987-09-8
- The Gospel Reloaded by Chris Seay and Greg Garrett (Pinon Press, 2003) ISBN 1-57683-478-6
- The "Matrix": What Does the Bible Say About... by D. Archer (Scripture Union, 2001) ISBN 1-85999-579-9
- [Journey to the Source: Decoding Matrix Trilogy] by Pradheep Challiyil (Sakthi Books 2004) ISBN 0-9752586-0-5
- Exploring the Matrix: Visions of the Cyber Present by Karen Haber (St. Martin's Press, 2003) ISBN 0-312-31358-6
- Philosophers Explore The Matrix by Christopher Gray (Oxford University Press, 2005) ISBN 0-19-518107-7
- The Matrix Cultural Revolution by Michel Marriott (Thunder's Mouth Press, 2003) ISBN 1-56025-574-9
- Begin Transmission: The Trans Allegories of The Matrix by Tilly Bridges (BearManor Media, 2023) ISBN 979-8887711263
- The Matrix Reflections: Choosing between reality and illusion by Eddie Zacapa (Authorhouse, 2005) ISBN 1-4208-0782-X
- The One by A.J. Yager & Dean Vescera (Lifeforce Publishing, 2003) ISBN 0-9709796-1-4
- Matrix og ulydighedens evangelium (Danish for: "Matrix and the Evangelium of disobedients") by Rune Engelbreth Larsen (Bindslev, 2004) ISBN 87-91299-12-8
- The Third Eye: Where It All Begins by Sophia Stewart (All Eyes on Me, 2006) ISBN 0-9785396-4-8
- The Matrix 4 – The Evolution of Consciousness: Cracking the Genetic Code by Sophia Stewart (All Eyes on Me, 2010) ISBN 0-9785396-7-2
- The Matrix and the Alice Books by Voicu Mihnea Simandan (Lulu Books, 2010) ISBN 978-0557258079

== See also ==
- Religion and the Internet – Overview of the relation between the Internet and religion
- The Meatrix – 2003 parody animation short
