= Poughkeepsie Day School =

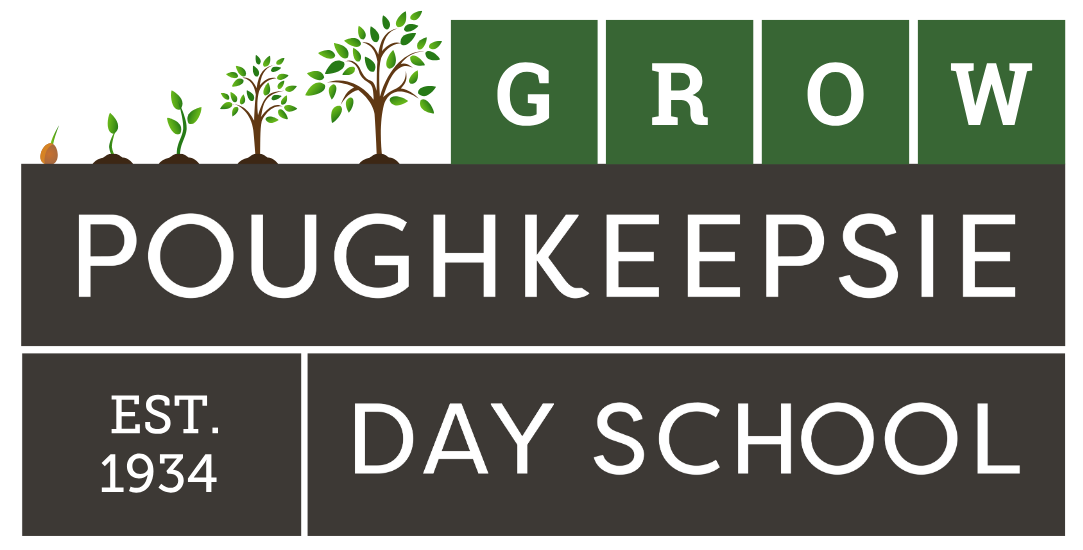

Location
- Poughkeepsie, NY; United States; 41.659495°N 73.88851°W

Information
- Type: Independent, Private
- Founded: 1934; 92 years ago
- Head of school: Spiro Gouras
- Faculty: 15 full- and part-time teachers
- Grades: Pre-K–8
- Enrollment: 36 students
- Student to teacher ratio: 7:1
- Campus size: 35 acres
- Website: www.poughkeepsieday.org

Poughkeepsie Day School is an independent, progressive, coeducational school in the mid-Hudson Valley serving students from a broad region of New York and Connecticut from pre-kindergarten through 8th grade.

== History ==
Founded in 1934, it was initially located at Hooker and South Grand Avenues in the city of Poughkeepsie, where it began with 35 students and three faculty members. The school outgrew that facility, and in 1963, it moved to premises on the Vassar College campus at 39 New Hackensack Road. The school eventually outgrew that facility and in 1998 acquired two buildings from IBM on Boardman Road.

One was a former IBM briefing center, built in 1963, which the school named the Elizabeth C. Gilkeson Center in honor of Elizabeth Gilkeson, director from 1935 to 1949.

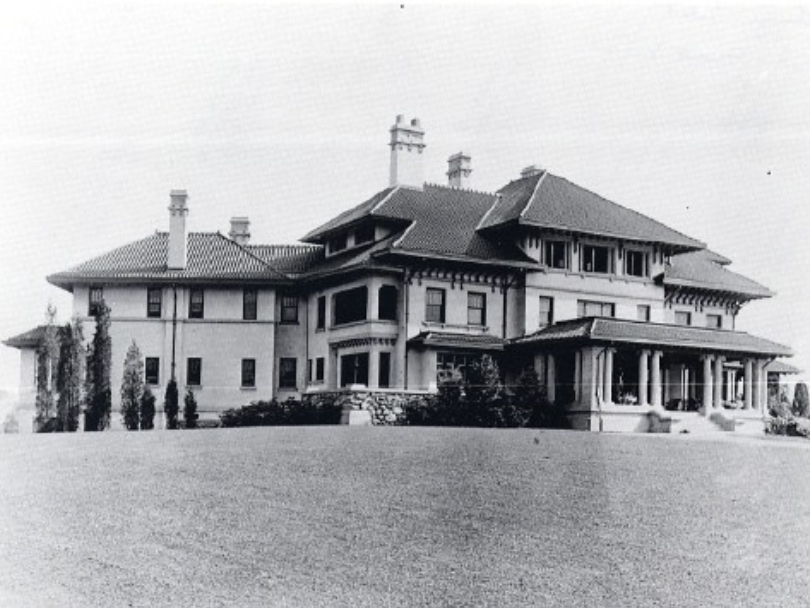
The Clarence Keynon House, photographed in 1913, the year of its construction. Poughkeepsie, NY.

The second is the historic Clarence Kenyon House, built between 1909 and 1913 and designed by the architect Percival Lloyd. The Kenyon House was part of the former Helen Kenyon estate, known as Cliffdale. In 1944, IBM purchased the 217-acre estate for temporary use as a research and engineering laboratory connected with its wartime work at Plant No. 4 in Poughkeepsie. The estate had earlier been owned by New York lawyer Andrew Boardman, who bought the property sometime before the American Civil War and gave it the name Cliffdale.

In 2000, the school's theater and auditorium was dedicated in honor of the actor James Earl Jones, who funded its construction and whose son Flynn attended the school in the 1990s and early 2000s. Jones and his wife, the actress Cecilia Hart, supported the school with fundraisers at the Bardavon 1869 Opera House, including a 1998 reading from A. R. Gurney's Love Letters alongside the actress Mary Tyler Moore. Other notables whose children or grandchildren attended the school include folk singer Pete Seeger, actors David Strathairn and William Sadler, singer/songwriter Graham Parker, and the jazz drummer Jack DeJohnette.

In April 2020, the school announced plans to close, citing a decline in enrollment and shrinking revenue, brought on by the COVID-19 pandemic. In 2021, a coalition of parents, teachers, and alumni developed a plan to keep the school open and to place it on a more financially sustainable path. The school reopened for the 2021–22 academic year with lower tuition and a smaller enrollment, and remains open and operational as of the 2025-26 academic year. The school accepts applications from new students for grades pre-K through 8, with rolling admissions throughout the year.

In January 2024, the school announced the launch of a new high school program called the Navigator Institute, focusing on three core values: service, engagement, and self-efficacy. It is scheduled to launch with the incoming ninth grade class in September 2028.

The school officially became an International Baccalaureate (IB) candidate school for the IB Primary Years Programme (PYP) and Middle Years Programme (MYP) in January 2025, with plans to become an authorized IB World School by September 2027.

=== Sale of Elizabeth C. Gilkeson Center ===
In 2022, the Town of Poughkeepsie explored a plan to purchase the school's property on Boardman Road and consolidate town offices. In June 2023, the town put that plan on hold.

In April 2026, the Town of Poughkeepsie closed on the purchase of the Elizabeth C. Gilkeson Center from Poughkeepsie Day School for $6.35 million. The town announced plans to relocate Town Hall to the building, while the school planned to move its operations to the Kenyon House on the same campus. Under the arrangement, the school was expected to retain access to facilities in the Gilkeson Center, including the James Earl Jones Theater and gymnasium.

== Accreditation ==
Poughkeepsie Day School is accredited by the New York State Association of Independent Schools (NYSAIS), and is a member of the National Association of Independent Schools (NAIS) and the Independent Curriculum Group (ICG).

== Notable alumni and attendees ==
- Molly Baz
- Ivan Cash
- Celeste Dupuy-Spencer
- Douglas Elmendorf
- Virginia Page Fortna
- Tom Finkelpearl
- Lauren Holmes
- Jonathan Keltz
- Swati Khurana
- Lucy Knisley
- Gavrik Losey
- Noah Lyon
- Jeh Johnson
- Lee Miringoff, founder of the Marist Poll
- Lee Knox Ostertag
- John R. Ross
- Jonathan Russell
- Jonah Sachs
- Pril Smiley
- Ingeborg von Zadow

== Notable faculty and staff ==
- Sally Luther
- Eric Person
