= Open range (disambiguation) =

Open range, in Western United States, is the publicly accessible grazeland.

Open range may also refer to:

- Rangeland, vast natural landscapes
- Publicly owned rangeland, in the United States
- Open Range Communications, a Colorado-based (now bankrupt) telecommunications business
- Open-range zoo
- Open Range (1927 film), a lost silent film from Paramount Pictures.
- Open Range (2003 film), a Western film co-starring, co-produced, and directed by Kevin Costner
- Open interval (mathematics), closed and open intervals being referred to as "ranges" in programming contexts.

== See also ==
- Free range (disambiguation)
