= Citizens' Stamp Advisory Committee =

Committee of the United States Postal Service

The United States Postal Service's Citizens' Stamp Advisory Committee (CSAC) evaluates potential subjects for U.S. postage stamps and reports its recommendations to the postmaster general, who makes the final decision.

== Purpose ==
Each year, the Postal Service receives thousands of letters and petitions from the American public proposing stamp subjects. Established in 1957, the Citizens’ Stamp Advisory Committee (CSAC) reviews all of the proposals and selects stamp subjects that will be of enduring interest to large segments of the American population. The Postal Service relies on CSAC to produce a balanced stamp program of approximately 25 – 30 stamp subjects each year. The annual stamp program is designed to reflect many different aspects of American culture and includes stamps honoring individuals, history, culture, sports, and science and technology. The vast majority of proposals submitted, suggesting many meritorious and meaningful subjects, do not result in U.S. postage stamps.

One of CSAC's most important functions is to ensure that every subject proposal is given the same level of consideration. CSAC treats every proposal the same way, regardless of any professional lobbying efforts, letter-writing campaigns, petitions, and/or appeals to influential politicians.

== Members and workings ==
CSAC is composed of ten to fifteen members who are appointed by the postmaster general. Members are chosen because of their expertise in education, art, design, history, and literature.

The committee meets quarterly to consider subject proposals. Every submission received since the previous meeting is reviewed and considered based on the guidelines and criteria established for stamp subjects (see below). The selected subjects are researched and presented at the next meeting. CSAC's non-binding recommendations are forwarded to the postmaster general for approval.

Once subjects are finalized, CSAC reviews proposed artwork and designs. Given the lengthy review and design process, the public is advised to submit ideas at least three years before the anticipated date of issue.

=== Current members ===
In late 2024, the committee had the following members:

- Gail Anderson (2013–present)
- Peter Argentine (2014–present)
- Graham Beck (2024–present)
- Kevin Butterfield (2021–present)
- Ivan Cash (2018–present)
- Alicia Cheng (2024–present)
- Spencer Crew (2018–present)
- Cheryl Ganz (2014–present)
- Mike Harrity (2018–present)
- Trish Jackson (2024-present)
- Joseph L. Kelley (2021–present), chairman
- Roger Ream (2021–present)

Susana Rodriguez de Tembleque was appointed on January 23, 2026.

=== Former members (partial list) ===
- Antonio Alcala (2010-2011)
- Douglas Arant
- Benjamin F. Bailar (2006-2014)
- Caroline Baumann (2012-2015)
- Ernest Borgnine (1975-1984)
- Catherine Drinker Bowen
- Cary R. Brick
- Michael Brock
- Franklin Richard Bruns Jr.
- B.J. Bueno (2012–2023)
- Justin Bua (2014–2017)
- William H. Buckley
- Bruce Catton
- Richard Coyne
- Meredith J. Davis
- Donna de Varona (2006–2018)
- Stevan Dohanos
- C. Belmont Faries
- Jean Picker Firstenberg
- Stanley H. Fryczynski Jr.
- Dr. Henry Louis Gates Jr. (2004–2016)
- Dana Gioia (2010-2013)
- Sylvia Harris
- Jessica Helfand (2006-2012)
- Ira Michael Heyman
- John M. Hotchner
- Janet Klug (2010–2019)
- Carolyn Lewis (2014–2021)
- C. Douglas Lewis
- Harry L. Lindquist (1957-1961)
- John Maass
- Eric Madsen (2010-2013)
- Karl Malden (1990-2009)
- James J. Matejka Jr.
- Phil Meggs
- Ervine Metzl
- James Michener (1979-1986)
- Joan Adams Mondale (2005-2010)
- Dr. Virginia M. Noelke
- Mary Ann Aspinwall Owens
- Howard Paine
- B. Martin Pedersen (2006-2011)
- Digger Phelps
- Jerry Pinkney
- Harry Rinker (2012–2023)
- Ronald A. Robinson
- John P. Roche
- Clara E. Rodriguez (2008-2011)
- Jack Rosenthal
- Maria E. Santana (2003-2006)
- Maruchi Santana (2012–2022)
- Debra Shriver (2012-2014)
- George Stevens Jr.
- Roger L. Stevens
- J. Bradbury Thompson (1969-1978)
- Katherine C. Tobin, Ph.D. (2013–2022)
- Norman Todhunter
- L. Rohe Walter
- Kurt Wiener
- Andrew Wyeth
- James B. Wyeth

Known "Years Served" from:

== Controversy ==
Benjamin F. Bailar, who had served as the United States Postmaster General from February 16, 1975, to March 15, 1978, was appointed to the committee in December 2006. In July 2014, Bailar resigned from the committee in protest over the increasingly commercial choices for stamp designs and suggested that the committee might no longer be necessary.

== Selection guidelines ==
The U.S. Postal Service and the members of the Citizens' Stamp Advisory Committee (CSAC) use the following criteria to determine the eligibility of subjects for commemoration on all U.S. stamps and stationery.

1. As a general policy, U.S. postage stamps and stationery primarily will feature American or American-related subjects. Other subjects can be considered if they have had a significant impact on American history or culture.
2. The Postal Service will consider honoring living people who have made extraordinary contributions to American society and culture. These remarkable individuals through their transformative achievements in their respective fields will have made enduring contributions to the United States of America.
3. Commemorative stamps or postal stationery honoring individuals usually will be issued to celebrate births, anniversaries, and/or significant contributions.
4. A memorial stamp will be issued honoring each U.S. president following their death.
5. Events of historical significance shall be considered for commemoration on anniversaries in multiples of 50 years.
6. Themes of widespread national appeal and significance that reflect our nation's inclusiveness, events, and persons will be considered. Official postal cancellations may be requested through the local postmaster for significant local events or commemorations.
7. Statehood anniversary commemorative stamps will be issued at intervals of 50 years from the date of the state's entry into the Union. Requests for observance of other state-related or regional anniversaries will be considered as subjects for postal stationery at intervals of 50 years from the date of the event.
8. Universities and other institutions of higher education will be considered for stamped cards in connection with the 200th anniversaries of their founding.
9. A subject will not typically be considered if a stamp on the same subject has been issued in the past 50 years. The exceptions to this criterion are traditional themes such as national symbols and holidays.
10. The stamp program commemorates positive contributions to American life, history, and culture; disasters will not be commemorated on U.S. postage stamps or stationery.
11. The following are not considered eligible for commemoration: government agencies, localities, non-profit organizations, associations, and similar entities. Stamps or stationery items shall not be issued to honor religious institutions or individuals whose principal achievements are associated with religious undertakings or beliefs.
12. Stamps may be issued for the major military services (Air Force, Army, Navy, and Marines) on 50-year anniversaries (or multiples) of their current organizational structure. Stamps for the major service academies will be considered on a case-by-case basis for 50-year anniversaries (or multiples). Due to the large number of individual units with the military services, stamps will not be issued to honor individual groups or units within the military.

== See also ==
- Citizens Coinage Advisory Committee
