= The Story of Stuff =

- Directed by: Louis Fox
- Written by: Annie Leonard
- Produced by: Erica Priggen
- Narrated by: Annie Leonard
- Edited by: Braelan Murray
- Release date: December 4, 2007 (Online)
- Running time: 20 minutes
- Language: English

The Story of Stuff is a short animated documentary about the lifecycle of material goods. The documentary is critical of excessive consumerism and promotes sustainability.

Filmmaker Annie Leonard wrote and narrated the film, which was funded by Tides Foundation, Funders Workgroup for Sustainable Production and Consumption, Free Range Studios and other foundations. Free Range Studios also produced the documentary, which was first launched online on December 4, 2007.

The documentary is used in elementary schools, arts programs, and economics classes as well as places of worship and corporate sustainability trainings. By February 2009, it had been seen in 228 countries and territories. According to the Los Angeles Times as of July 2010, the film had been translated into 15 languages and had been viewed by over 12 million people.

== Contents ==
The 22-minute video presents a critical vision of consumerist society, primarily American, under the conditions of globalization. It purports to expose "the connections between a huge number of environmental and social issues, and calls us together to create an increasingly sustainable and just world." The video is made up of seven chapters: Introduction, Extraction, Production, Distribution, Consumption, Disposal, and Another Way.

Annie Leonard narrates her personal 10-year journey to understanding the materials economy. She explains it as a linear system composed of extraction, production, distribution, consumption, and disposal. She critiques this economy, pointing out that it entails hidden costs in human suffering, hidden influences on the government, and immense power accruing to large corporations. She focuses particularly on our accelerating consumption of resources and production of waste, because of a deliberate choice to encourage consumption through planned obsolescence and perceived obsolescence. She highlights the twin consequences of pollution and waste.

Leonard's thesis, "you cannot run a linear system on a finite planet indefinitely" is supported throughout the video by statistical data. Although the video itself doesn't give attribution to her information, the producers provide an annotated script that includes footnotes with explanations and sources for some of her assertions:

- "... more than 50% of our federal tax money is now going to the military..." She cites the War Resisters League website, which differs from government reports that put the figure at around 20-25%; WRL explains the difference in that it doesn't count trust funds like Social Security (since this revenue is not obtained directly from income taxes), considers veterans benefits as part of "past military" spending, and includes 80% of the debt interest payments under the rationale that most debt would have been avoidable with reduced military spending.
- "Of the 100 largest economies on Earth now, 51 are corporations." She cites Anderson & Cavanagh (2000), which bases this claim on the 1999 figures of GDP and corporate sales as reported by Fortune and the World Development Report 2000.
- "We [The U.S.] have 5% of the world's population but we're consuming 30% of the world's resources and creating 30% of the world's waste." She cites Seitz (2001), who says, "...in 1990 the United States, with about 5 percent of the world's population, was using about one-quarter of the energy being used by all nations." and a chapter in Global Environmental Issues that puts the US production of waste at around 10 billion tons per year before the turn of the millennium.
- "80% of the planet's original forests are gone." She cites the Natural Resources Defense Council website, which says that only about 20% of the world's original wilderness forests remain. and the website for the Rainforest Action Network.
- "Forty percent of waterways in the US have become undrinkable." She cites a source which she quotes in a footnote as actually having said, "Today, 40 percent of our nation's rivers are unfishable, unswimmable, or undrinkable".
- "In the Amazon alone, we're losing 2000 trees a minute." She cites de Seve (2002), which puts the Amazon deforestation rate in 1995 at 5 million acres (20,000 km^{2}) a year.
- "Each of us in the U.S. is targeted with more than 3,000 advertisements a day." This particular figure comes from the American Academy of Pediatrics which itself cites a 1999 Albuquerque Journal article by columnist Ellen Goodman on a figure of 3,000 ads viewed by young Americans on television, the internet, billboards, and magazines. Despite the specific wording of this article ("The average young person views more than 3000 ads per day..."), Annie Leonard specifies that she is referring to ads targeted, not necessarily viewed.
- "Each of us in the United States makes 4 1/2 pounds (2.04 kg) of garbage a day." She cites the U.S. Environmental Protection Agency website, which states that 245.7 million tons of municipal solid waste was produced in 2005. Taylor & Morrissey (2004:247) reiterates this figure.
- "Dioxin is the most toxic man made substance known to science. And incinerators are the number one source of dioxin." She cites Mocarelli et al.

Leonard also quotes what Victor Lebow said in 1955 regarding economic growth:

Our enormously productive economy... demands that we make consumption our way of life, that we convert the buying and use of goods into rituals, that we seek our spiritual satisfaction, our ego satisfaction, in consumption... we need things consumed, burned up, replaced and discarded at an ever-accelerating rate.

== Reaction ==
The Story of Stuff has been subject to public discussion, especially after The New York Times published a front-page article about the video on May 10, 2009. Even before The New York Times article, The Sustainable Enterprise Fieldbook pointed to The Story of Stuff as a successful portrayal of the problems with the consumption cycle, and Greyson (2008) says it is an engaging attempt to communicate circular economics. Ralph Nader called the film "a model of clarity and motivation." John Passacantando, The Executive Director of Greenpeace called it a "mega-hit on three levels".

It also attracted the attention of conservative commentators such as Glenn Beck, who characterized the video as an "anti-capitalist tale that unfortunately has virtually no facts correct." Influenced by such commentary, the Missoula school board opposed the screening of the film in a biology classroom in a 4–3 vote. The subsequent public outcry against this decision led to a rewrite of the school board's policy and an award for the teacher who screened the film.

== See also ==
- The Age of Stupid
- Brominated flame retardant
- Buy Nothing Project
- Cost externalizing
- Dioxins
- Incineration
- Planned obsolescence
- Pollution
- Recycling
- The Meatrix
- Transition Towns

== Bibliography ==
- Anderson, Sarah; Cavanagh, John (1996), The Top 200: The Rise of Global Corporate Power, Washington, D.C.: Institute for Policy Studies
- Anderson, Sarah; Cavanagh, John (2000), The Top 200: The Rise of Global Corporate Power (PDF), Washington, D.C.: Institute for Policy Studies, archived from the original (PDF) on 2006-03-16
- de Seve, Karen (2002), "Welcome to my jungle ... before it's gone", Science World
- Greyson, James (2008), "Systemic economic instruments for energy, climate and global security", in Barbir, Frano; Ulgiati, Sergio (eds.), Sustainable Energy Production and Consumption, Springer, pp. 139–158, ISBN 978-1-4020-8493-5, archived from the original on 2016-03-04
- Madison, James (1865), "Letters and other writings of James Madison", Volume 4 of Letters and Other Writings of James Madison: Fourth President of the United States, James Madison, J. B. Lippincott & co.
- Seitz, John L. (2001), Global Issues: An Introduction (1st ed.), Wiley-Blackwell
- Taylor, Ros; Morrissey, Kathy (2004), "Coping with Pollution: Dealing with Waste", in Harris, Frances (ed.), Global Environmental Issues, John Wiley and Sons, pp. 229–264, ISBN 0-470-84561-9
- Wirtenberg, Jeana; Russell, William G.; Lipsky, David (2008), The Sustainable Enterprise Fieldbook: When it All Comes Together, AMACOM, ISBN 978-0-8144-1278-7
