= Jonah Sachs =

- Born: May 19, 1975 (age 51); Brooklyn, New York
- Occupations: Storyteller; author; designer; entrepreneur
- Website: jonahsachs.com

Jonah Sachs (born May 19, 1975) is an American storyteller, writer, designer and entrepreneur. He is the author of Winning the Story Wars: Why Those Who Tell—and Live—the Best Stories Will Rule the Future (2012) and Unsafe Thinking: How to Be Nimble and Bold When You Need It Most. Sachs is the co-founder and former CEO of Free Range Studios, a brand-consulting agency for social brands and causes with campaigns based on storytelling.

== Early life ==
Sachs was born in Brooklyn, New York, to Nancy Kantor and Allan Sachs. He has two siblings : Emily and Zoe. Sachs attended Wesleyan University, where he served as editor-in-chief of the school’s newspaper for two semesters. In that role, he wrote about campus politics and social justice issues. He graduated from Wesleyan in 1997 with a bachelor's degree in American Studies.

== Career ==
After graduation, Sachs moved to Washington, D.C., where he reconnected with his childhood friend Louis Fox, and they decided to form Free Range Studios together with the goal of offering social causes the same kind of communication tools that corporate brands have in the media space. The agency worked with the Amnesty International, the ACLU, SEIU, Earthjustice, Greenpeace International, Autodesk, the Sierra Club, and the Harvard Civil Rights Project.

== Works ==
The Meatrix (released November 2003), a spoof on the blockbuster movie The Matrix, is a film about factory meat farming. Sachs also helped produce the video The Story of Stuff, a 20-minute video that has reached over 10 million viewers in over 200 countries. The video is an animated documentary about the lifecycle of material goods.

Sachs’ book, Winning the Story Wars: Why Those Who Tell—And Live—the Best Stories Will Rule the Future, was inspired from the early days of Volkswagen, Apple, and Nike to the viral breakthroughs of Yes We Can, the Tea Party movement, The Story of Stuff, and Patagonia. The book has gained acclaim from Forbes, Publishers Weekly, and 800 CEO READ. In 2018, Sachs published his second book, Unsafe Thinking: How to Be Nimble and Bold When You Need it Most.

Sachs’ interactive work has been honoured with “Best Of” awards three times at the South By Southwest interactive festival. Sachs and his work have been featured in The New York Times, The Washington Post, CNN, FOX News, Sundance Film Festival, NPR, The Colbert Report, and Fast Company magazine, which named him one of the 50 most influential social innovators.
