= The Matrix Revisited =

2001 documentary film

- DVD cover
- Directed by: Josh Oreck
- Produced by: Eric Matthies
- Starring: The Wachowskis; Joel Silver; Keanu Reeves
- Distributed by: Warner Home Video
- Release date: November 20, 2001
- Running time: 123 minutes
- Country: United States
- Language: English

The Matrix Revisited is a 2001 American documentary film about the production of the 1999 film The Matrix. It was released on DVD and VHS on November 20, 2001, by Warner Home Video.

== Overview ==
The film goes behind the scenes of the 1999 sci-fi movie to give explanations of complicated scenes, previews of the then-forthcoming sequels, and interviews with the cast and crew, including the reclusive Wachowski siblings, who rarely give interviews.

It was first released as the first and only documentary in the series, but was later included as the part of a two-disc Collector's Edition of The Matrix. It now forms a part of The Ultimate Matrix Collection.

== Music ==
The original Matrix Revisited DVD had an easter egg that contains 41 songs that were played in the documentary. One can access this music by going to the Documentary Menu, selecting the Languages Menu and highlighting one of the subtitle options. Press left to highlight a 'phone booth'. In The Ultimate Matrix Collection version of the disc, the songs are directly in the menu and not part of an egg. The songs are as follows:

1. Aleks Svaensson – "Syvelleve"
2. da.nu.lo – "I'm not right (Im what's left)"
3. Gooding – "Licorice and Grape Kool Aid"
4. Jetsetmusic – "Last Laugh Foundation Part C"
5. Obadia – "Lounge"
6. Obadia – "Slowride"
7. Omniverse – "Hipshot"
8. The Fur Ones – "Semicolon"
9. Robert Phoenix – "Speedy Astronaut"
10. Canton – "Birmingham, 43"
11. Electrostatic – "Electron Gun"
12. Ikarus – "Praying to Different Gods"
13. Nolens Volens – "Por Sea T"
14. Out of Body – "Beyond Mind"
15. Paul Cooper – "CEM2 New Stuff"
16. Proactive Noize Transmission – "One foot freek"
17. Project 3 – "Go get it"
18. Void – "Chemical2000"
19. Audible Ink – "Sand Turtle"
20. O.R.G. – "Sofa Surfur"
21. Simulacra – "Spy Vs Spy"
22. Wade R – "Squarely in the groove"
23. Audible Ink – "Beetle Instrumental"
24. Beet T Tribe – "Beet T Tribe (slight return)"
25. Fingertwister – "7 a.m. Disaster"
26. Hardknox – "Coz I can"
27. Aleks Svaensson – "Art of Recycling"
28. Canton – "Blue Groove"
29. Fingertwister – "Casino Royale"
30. Aleks Svaensson – "Sunny"
31. Fingertwister – "In Memory of..."
32. Less Skill – "Technical Difficulties"
33. Simulacra – "Panacea"
34. Fingertwister – "The Reverend Will Return"
35. O.R.G. – "Traveling Man"
36. Project 3 – "The Search"
37. Tripnotic – "Tripnofunk"
38. The Fur Ones – "Transit"
39. The Fur Ones – "Product"
40. The Fur Ones – "The End"
41. The Fur Ones – "Reduction"

== See also ==
- Simulated reality
- Visual effect
