= Free roam =

Free roam may refer to:

- Free roam game, in video gaming
- A roaming type in wireless telecommunication
- A feral animal

== See also ==
- Freedom to roam
- Free range (disambiguation)
- Open range
