= C. Belmont Faries =

American philatelist

- Born: June 3, 1913; Wilmington, Delaware
- Died: January 19, 1998 (aged 84); Livingston, Montana
- Spouse: Bette Jane Faries
- Engineering career
- Institutions: Citizens' Stamp Advisory Committee
- Projects: Edited various philatelic publications; member of the Citizens' Stamp Advisory Committee
- Awards: Lagerloef Award; APS Hall of Fame; Luff Award

C. Belmont Faries (June 3, 1913 – January 19, 1998), of Washington, D.C., was a philatelist who dedicated his entire career to editing philatelic publications.

== Philatelic editing ==
Faries edited a number of philatelic journals including the SPA Journal (of the Society of Philatelic Americans), the Minkus Stamp and Coin Journal, and the U.S. Specialist. He contributed to various journals and publications, including Scott's Monthly Journal and Stamp Collector newspaper, and was the stamp hobby columnist for the Washington Star.

== Philatelic activity ==
Belmont was a member of the Citizens' Stamp Advisory Committee for the U.S. Post Office Department, and continued his work with the committee when it was reorganized as the U.S. Postal Service on July 1, 1971.

== Honors and awards ==
Faries was awarded the Lagerloef Award by the Society of Philatelic Americans in 1969 and the Luff Award for Exceptional Contributions to Philately in 1992. He was named to the American Philatelic Society Hall of Fame in 2001.

== Legacy ==
Faries donated his library, notes, and working papers to the American Philatelic Research Library.

== See also ==
- Philately
- Philatelic literature
