= Tefere Gebre =

Ethiopian-American activist (born 1968)

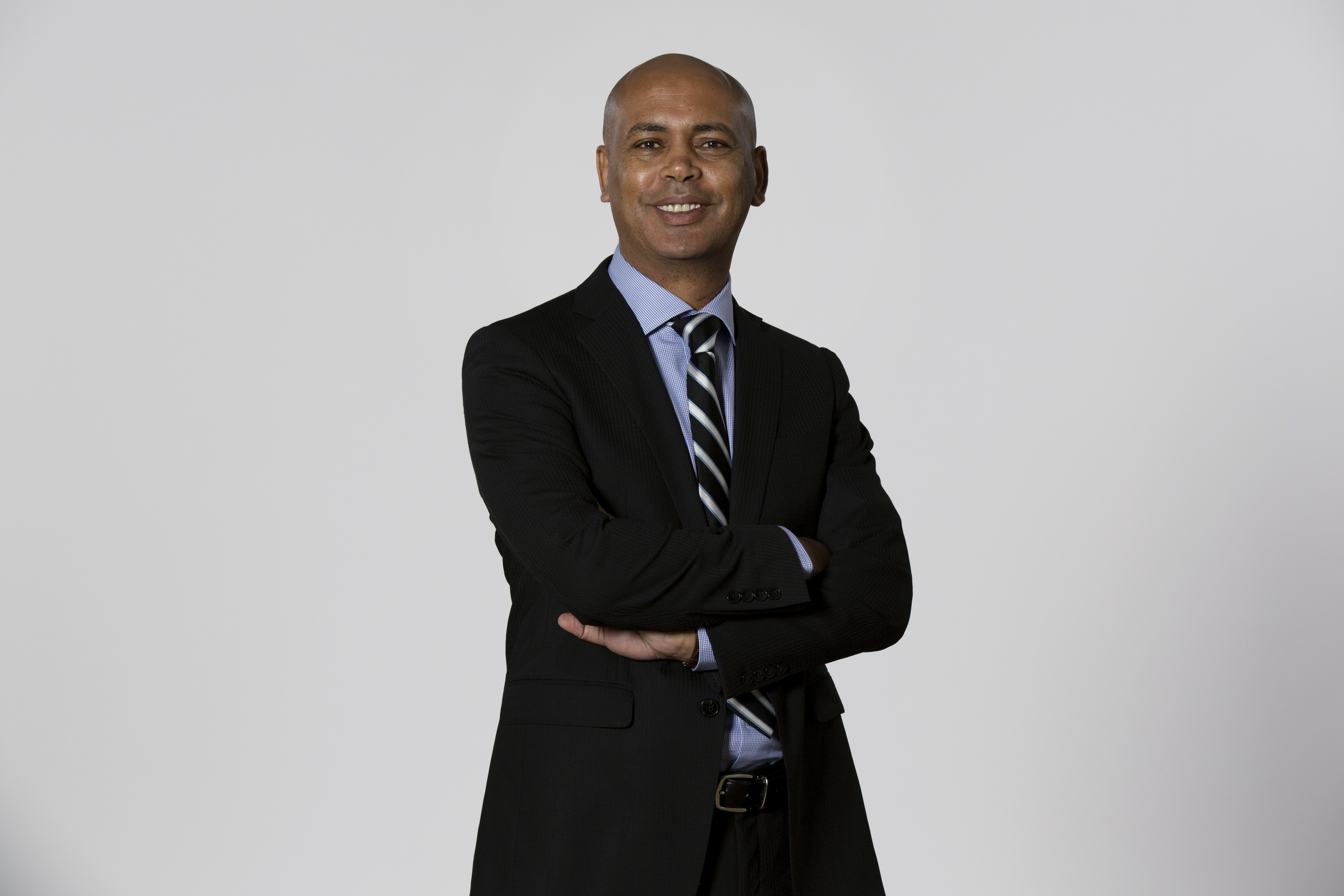
- Born: October 15, 1968 (age 57); Gondar, Ethiopia
- Education: California State Polytechnic University, Pomona (BA)

Tefere Gebre is an Ethiopian-American labor and human rights activist, and the chief program officer of Greenpeace USA. From 2013 until 2022, he was the executive vice president of the AFL-CIO.

== Early life ==
When he was 14 years old, Gebre fled Ethiopia, walking for weeks to Sudan. He lived in a refugee camp in Sudan until he was 15, when he was granted political refuge status and arrived in Los Angeles alone.

Gebre graduated in 1987 from Belmont High School in downtown Los Angeles. He attended Cal Poly Pomona on a track and field scholarship, where he won the 1989 Drake Relays college 4 × 800 m relay as a middle-distance runner. He later graduated from the college with a bachelor's degree in International Marketing. While in college, he worked his first union job as a night shift loader at UPS and a member of Teamsters Local 396. He credits his union job for making it possible for him to afford to attend college.

== Career ==
Early in his career, Gebre worked for then-Speaker of the California State Assembly, Willie L. Brown Jr., as a legislative aid and was twice elected as president of the California Young Democrats. He was the first Black-American and first immigrant elected to lead the California Young Democrats.

Gebre's first union organizing effort in Orange County was a successful campaign for sanitation workers. He served as the executive director of Frontlash, which was then the youth and college arm of the AFL-CIO. From 1997 to 1999, Gebre was director of governmental relation for Laborers Local 270. He later served as the Southern California political director of the California Labor Federation.

In 2006, Gebre began working for the Orange County Labor Federation, an umbrella organization of 90 unions, first as its political director, and then beginning in 2008 as the group's executive director. As director, he was credited with helping to "turn the umbrella group of unions into a political force in what remains Republican territory."

As part of an effort to defeat California Proposition 32 on the 2012 ballot, Gebre led the Orange County federation through an extensive voter outreach and education effort that was credited as playing a critical role in the defeat of the initiative.

Labor activists suggested Gebre's election "represents a generational and philosophical change at the federation -- one that values new progressive partnerships and non-traditional organizing." During the convention at which Gebre was elected, the AFL-CIO highlighted worker organizing campaigns that used non-traditional models of organizing within immigrant communities.

In an interview with Huffington Post, Gebre said, "I have personally never seen a labor meeting more open and ready to bring in more people – a labor movement that is now willing to speak up for the people who sweat behind the counters and in the kitchens of McDonald's, the cab drivers, the domestic workers, and the day laborers."

Gebre was the executive vice president of AFL-CIO. He was given the "Roving Ambassador for Peace” award in 2017.

Gebre joined Greenpeace USA as the organization’s chief program officer in March 2022. The New York Times said his appointment signals “the growing importance of ties between labor and environmental organizers on climate change.”
