= Spencer Crew =

American professor, museum director, curator and writer

Director of the Museum of African-American History
- Interim
- Assumed office 2019 – 2020

Member of the United States Postal Service's Citizens' Stamp Advisory Committee
- Incumbent
- Assumed office 2018

Personal details
- Born: Spencer R. Crew; January 7, 1949 (age 77)
- Education: Rutgers University
- Occupation: Professor, museum director, curator and writer

Spencer Crew (born January 7, 1949) is an American professor, museum director, curator and writer.

== Early life and education ==
Born on January 7, 1949, in Woodmere Village, Ohio, Spencer R. Crew obtained a B.A. degree in history in 1971 from Brown University, and then from Rutgers University received his M.A. degree in history in 1973 and his Ph.D. in history in 1979. In 2003, he was named to the Rutgers Hall of Distinguished Alumni.

== Career ==
Crew's career in museums began in 1981 when he was hired to work as a historian at the National Museum of American History (NMAH). In 1986, he curated his first exhibition at the museum, Field to Factory: African-American Migration, 1915–1940. He became the first African-American director of the NMAH in 1994.

In 2001, he became the director of the National Underground Railroad Freedom Center.

In 2019, Crew was appointed the interim director of the National Museum of African American History and Culture.

Crew is the Clarence J. Robinson Professor of U.S. history at George Mason University.
