= Greenpeace USA =

US climate change organization

- Formation: 1979
- Founded: 1975
- Type: Non-governmental organization
- Purpose: Environmentalism
- Location: Washington, D.C.
- Region served: United States
- Method: Campaigning, lobbying, research, direct action
- Key people: Annie Leonard (co-executive director) Ebony Twilley Martin (co-executive director)
- Website: www.greenpeace.org/usa/

Greenpeace USA is the United States affiliate of Greenpeace International, an environmental nonprofit organization that spawned a social movement inspired by direct actions on the high seas to stop whaling and nuclear testing. Headquartered in Washington D.C., Greenpeace USA. operates with an annual budget of approximately $40 million, employing over 500 people in 2020. The organization relies on donations from members, refuses corporate contributions and refrains from endorsing political candidates, though in 2020 Greenpeace USA issued climate scorecards for presidential candidates and ranked them from best to worst on climate

In a 2022 move to unite the labor and environmental movements, Greenpeace USA.'s co-director Annie Leonard, producer of web videos on throw-away consumer culture, recruited Tefere Gebre, the executive vice-president of the AFL-CIO, to become chief program officer overseeing campaigns and communications with an emphasis on climate justice. Since its inception in the 1970s, Greenpeace USA. has waged a series of corporate campaigns, street protests and sting operations focused on de-escalating the arms race, drawing connections between the climate crisis and militarism, stopping deforestation, ending fossil fuels, preventing plastic pollution and other issues.

== Organizational structure ==
Greenpeace USA is a nonprofit 501(c) (4) lobby group that seeks “to change current environmental policies and practices” through “grassroots lobbying for various legislative initiatives.” The Greenpeace Fund is a 501 (c) (3) tax deductible charitable organization that promotes Greenpeace USA's mission to protect the environment. The Greenpeace Fund makes grants, conducts education campaigns and funds research, including a report on social media companies' lack of transparency in addressing climate change disinformation.

In 2020 Greenpeace USA's budget was approximately $40 million with hundreds of people on payroll.

The organization also relies on volunteer activists to work in the following capacities: small group regional "action pods" to promote green campaigns on the local level; ambassadors to lead volunteer programs; letter writers to influence voters or target corporations; text bankers to mobilize Greenpeace supporters and voters during elections.

Greenpeace USA is one of 26 national and regional organizations (NRO's) that are members of the Amsterdam-based Greenpeace International. As a member, Greenpeace USA is expected to implement and support Greenpeace International's long term overarching program campaigns. Each NRO has its own legal unit and governing board.

== History ==
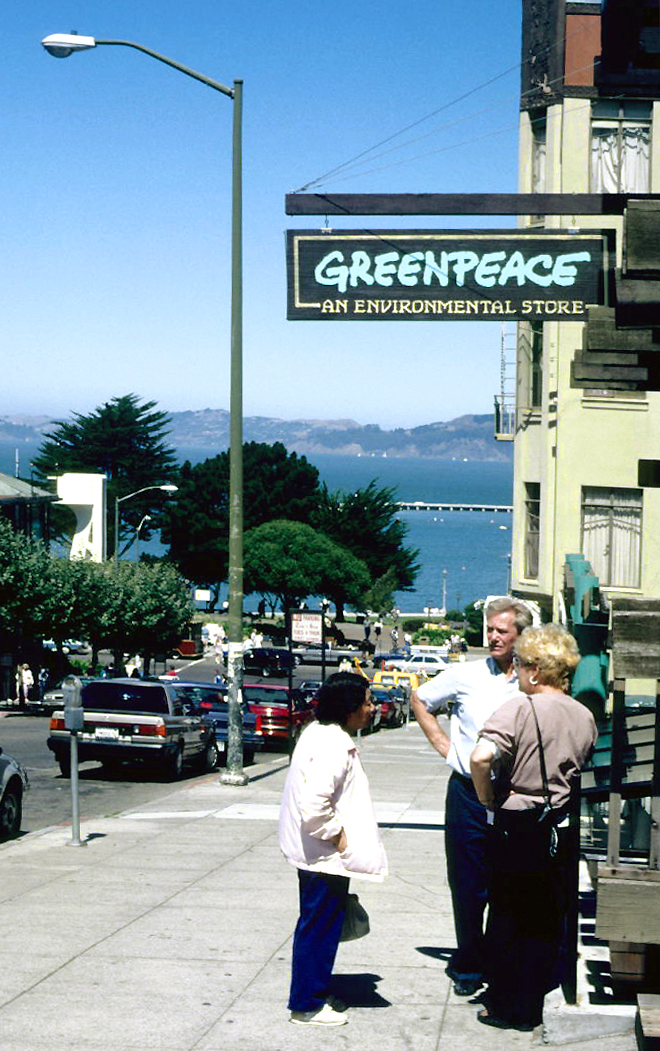
San Francisco, 1989. Greenpeace shop at Larkin Street.

Greenpeace was first organized in the United States as independent corporations in 1975, when Greenpeace San Francisco opened, followed by groups in Hawaii, Seattle, Portland, Los Angeles, Boston, Denver, and the Great Lakes region. In 1979, these offices agreed to be represented on the board of a new corporation to be named "Greenpeace USA". The Vancouver, British Columbia based Greenpeace Foundation, the original Quaker-influenced Greenpeace organization, then filed a lawsuit against the San Francisco office for using the name Greenpeace, which the Canadian office said was trademarked. The conflict was resolved and a trial averted when an international Greenpeace council was formed with representation from each country to pay off the $250-thousand dollars of debt owed by the Vancouver office. In the late 1980s, Greenpeace USA underwent a budget-driven restructuring to effectively make the USA a fundraising base for European campaigns, closing down all of the original Greenpeace corporations throughout the country except the U.S. organization incorporated in Hawaii, which has continued a national and international campaign presence as an unaffiliated organization since 1985.

=== Jon Hinck, co-founder ===
In November 1978, when Jon Hinck was 24 and unemployed in Seattle, he answered a Greenpeace magazine Help Wanted ad, "Selling advertising for a good cause." Though hesitant to join a radical group then based in Vancouver, B.C., he took the sales job in Seattle and later began reporting for the magazine, covering the dumping of nuclear waste and use of toxic herbicides. After demonstrating his creativity as an activist, "posting official-looking pollution warning signs at local lakes" — Hinck was hired as the campaign director for Greenpeace Seattle... In late 1979, he represented that office at a meeting of the U.S.-based branches of Greenpeace and joined in the creation of the new national affiliate, Greenpeace USA. Under Hinck's leadership as national campaign director, Greenpeace Seattle, together with Greenpeace Vancouver, worked to prevent oil pollution on the Northwest Coast with a successful ban on oil supertankers in Puget Sound and rejection of the Northern Tier Pipeline. The work of Hinck's team at Greenpeace USA, along with that of other activists, resulted in the U.S. government's end to nuclear waste disposal at sea. Greenpeace subsequently achieved a total ban on nuclear dumping through the Convention on the Prevention of Marine Pollution by Dumping of Wastes and Other Matter.

=== Phil Radford, executive director (2009-2014) ===
In 2009, 33-year-old Phil Radford, a Greenpeace canvasser, was hired as executive director of Greenpeace USA. Radford, the youngest executive director in the organization's US history, was formerly the executive director of Power Shift, a grassroots Internet-based online community for youth in the climate movement. In a 2014 exit interview with Greenbiz, Radford said Greenpeace USA. played an integral role in pressuring Asia Pulp & Paper to stop deforestation to preserve biodiversity and carbon storage in Indonesia. In launching a corporate campaign, Radford said the organization first conducts extensive research, then approaches a company or industry with a request to negotiate an agreement. If an agreement fails to materialize, Greenpeace will launch a public campaign to pressure the worst corporate abuser, and then recruit the targeted company to support new industry regulations. Radford added another approach when pushing for industry-wide transformation is to launch local and state ballot initiatives.

== Current leadership ==
Once jokingly known as an organization of "boys and their boats," Greenpeace USA. is currently headed by two women:

=== Annie Leonard, co-executive director (2014-2023) ===
In 2014, following the departure of Phil Radford, Greenpeace USA hired Annie Leonard, a single mother, as co-executive director. An author, activist and filmmaker, Leonard produced the popular 2007 web video, "The Story of Stuff," which traces the extraction, manufacture, production and distribution of disposable consumer items. Leonard's activism with Greenpeace USA dates back to 1998, when in her 20s she worked on a campaign to halt the exportation of hazardous waste to poor countries. She travelled the world tracking waste disposal and investigating companies, work that led to the Basel Convention, an international agreement that reduces the exportation of waste from wealthier countries to poorer nations. One of Leonard's top priorities is exposing the influence of oil money in politics, with a focus on billionaires funding climate change denial.

=== Ebony Twilley Martin, executive director (2021-present) ===
In 2021, Greenpeace selected Ebony Twilley Martin as co-executive director, making her the first Black woman executive director of a national environmental organization in the United States. Prior to the appointment, Twilley had worked at Greenpeace USA as chief officer of people and culture, senior talent acquisition manager and director of human resources. Twilley Martin became an environmental activist in 2008 after her son developed asthma living near a busy Maryland highway. Twilley's goals include a climate emergency declaration and an end to fossil fuel subsidies. In addition, she hopes to act as a bridge between the climate movement and communities of color. In accepting the position, Twilley wrote, "“The environmental challenges we face are enormous–a point that Hurricane Ida has underscored when it slammed into Louisiana’s coast, a site of longstanding environmental health and justice struggles and now on the frontlines of the climate crisis. To address these intersecting crises, we have to build a strong and diverse organization ..."

=== Tefere Gebre, chief program officer (2022-present) ===
Tefere Gebre, former Executive Vice President of the AFL-CIO, was recruited to serve as Greenpeace USA's Chief Program Officer overseeing campaigns, direct action and organizing. “I’m not leaving the workers’ movement — I'm bringing workers to the environmental movement,” Gebre told the New York Times. Originally from Ethiopia, Gebre said he wants to focus the organization on the impacts of pollution on people of color, build a climate justice movement and unite trade unionists and environmentalists to resist a xenophobic response to the climate refugee crisis. During his tenure with the AFL-CIO, Gebre grew frustrated with the reluctance of some labor leaders to support the environmental movement.

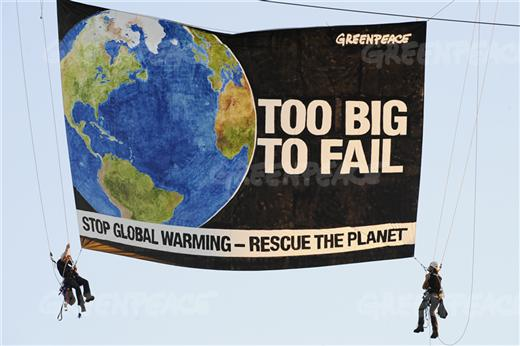
August 3, 2013. Two activists hanging a banner across the street from the Department of State in protest of government inaction on climate change during a Major Emitters Forum meeting. Credit: Tim Aubry, Director of Visual Communication Greenpeace USA

== Campaigns, protests and politics ==
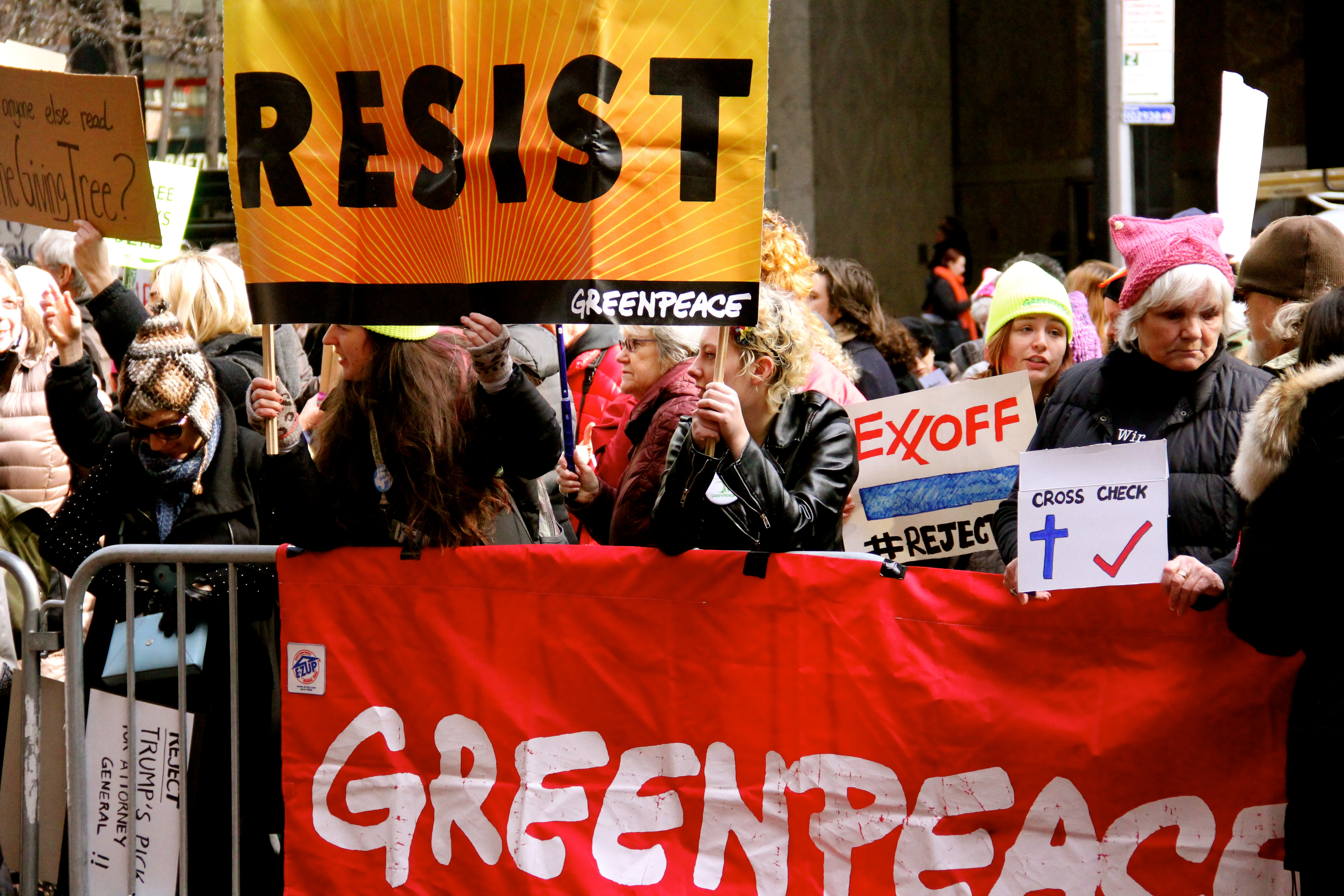
February 2, 2017. Resist Trump Rally at Chuck Schumer's NYC Office.

=== 2020 Presidential campaign ===
Although Greenpeace USA, a tax exempt organization, does not endorse political candidates, it does issue candidate and lawmaker scorecards. In the 2020 presidential race, Greenpeace USA ranked Senator Bernie Sanders (D-VT) as the best climate candidate with an A+ (94 out of 100) and incumbent president Donald Trump as the worst (0 out of 100). Joe Biden, who went on to win the presidential contest, received a D score for not releasing a plan to tackle the climate crisis. Greenpeace USA based its rankings on the candidates' support for a Green New Deal and an end to fossil fuels.

=== Climate and militarism ===
==== Ukraine and Russian oil ====
In March, 2022, following Russia's invasion of Ukraine, Greenpeace activists set out in boats to intercept a 50,000 ton Greek vessel delivering Russian oil to the port of New York. Activists unfurled a banner "Oil fuels war" to draw attention to the continuous deliveries of Russian oil despite President Biden's call for sanctions. The protest occurred during a 45-day grace period leading up to the White House's imposition of sanctions against Russian oil and gas imports.

Anusha Narayanan, climate campaign director at Greenpeace USA and a protest participant, told the press,“The oil and gas companies that are responsible for our skyrocketing gas prices are the same companies that are fueling conflicts and death around the globe. A more peaceful, livable, and equal future depends on breaking our addiction to volatile and conflict-driven fossil fuels.”

=== Pipeline protests ===
==== Keystone pipeline ====
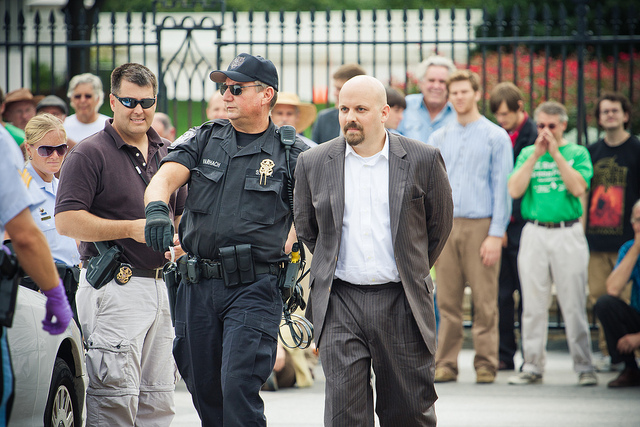
2011. Phil Radford, former executive director of Greenpeace USA, arrested in Keystone protest outside the White House. Credit: Joshua Lopez

From 2011 to 2013, Phil Radford, executive director of Greenpeace USA, participated in multiple White House protests demanding President Obama order a halt to construction of the Keystone XL tar sands pipeline. Using flexi-ties to attach themselves to the White House, protesters in business suits conducted a 2011 sit-in on Pennsylvania Avenue, urging Obama to issue executive orders to not only halt Keystone but also implement stricter rules to regulate power plant emissions, block coal and natural gas exports and maximize energy efficiency in buildings. Radford was arrested, along with actress Daryl Hannah, in the 2011 sit-in to protest President Obama's energy policies.

In 2021, Greenpeace USA applauded President's Biden executive order revoking the permit for the Keystone XL tar sands pipeline, while urging the President to eliminate all fossil fuel subsidies.

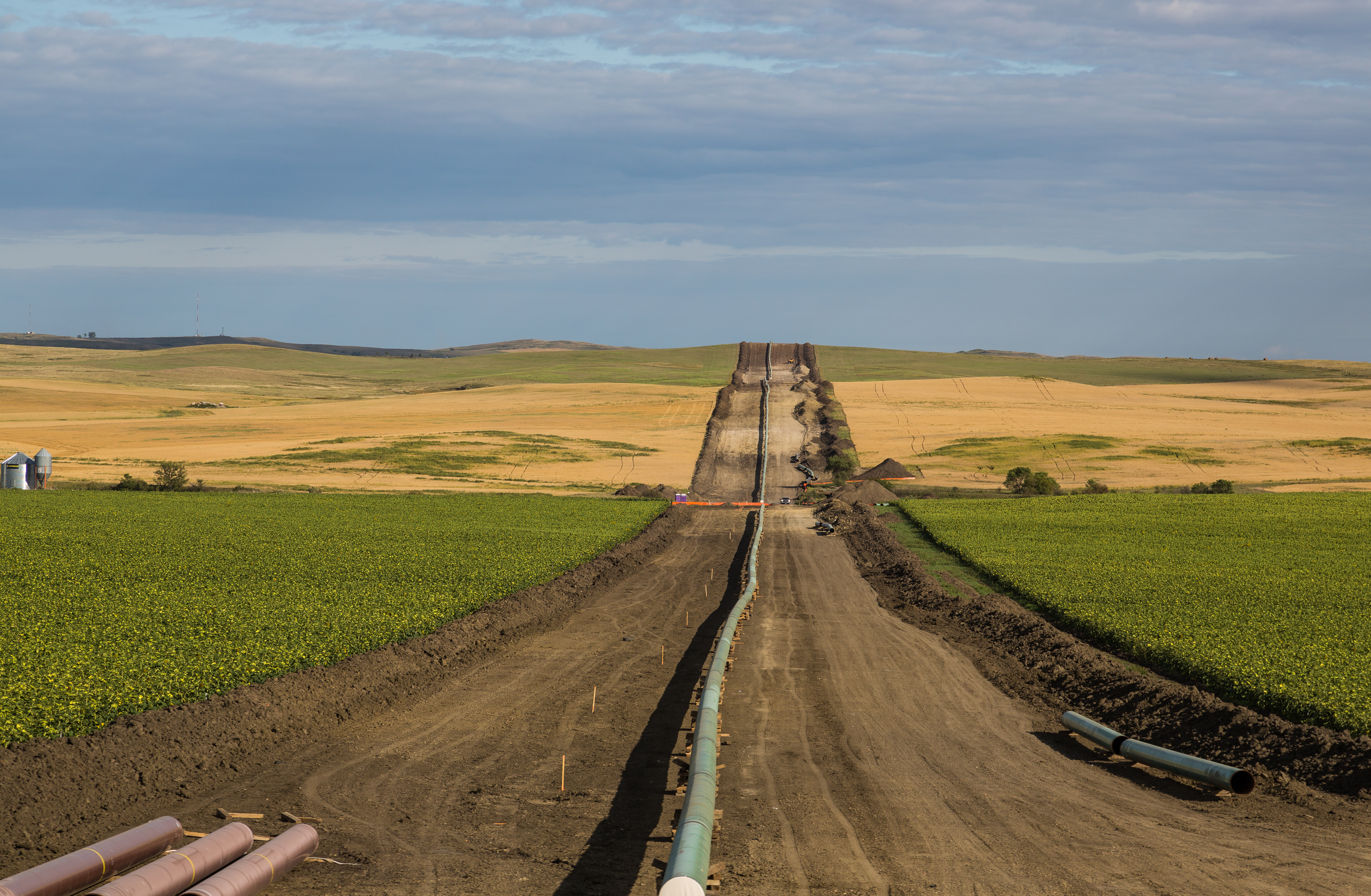
Dakota Access Oil Pipeline, North Dakota. 2016.

==== Dakota Access pipeline ====
In 2019 a federal court in North Dakota dismissed as unfounded a racketeering and defamation lawsuit filed by Energy Transfer Partners LP, the builder of the 1,000-mile Dakota Access Pipeline, against Greenpeace USA, EarthFirst and BankTrack for their pipeline protests. Greenpeace USA activists had joined with indigenous tribes and thousands of environmentalists from around the country to block construction of the pipeline. The protests drew national and international attention over Native American tribes' treaty rights, access to clean drinking water and the dangers of burning fossil fuels. The lawsuit alleged Greenpeace USA misled the public with false claims about the Standing Rock Sioux tribes' sacred sites and the likelihood the pipeline would contaminate the Missouri River in North Dakota. In contrast, a 2018 Greenpeace report said Energy Transfer pipelines and those owned by the company's subsidiaries "spilled over 500 times in the last decade."

In response to the court's ruling of insufficient evidence, Tom Wetterer, general counsel to Greenpeace USA, said the ruling "sends a clear message to companies trying to muzzle civil society that corporate overreach will not be tolerated. It is also a check on corporate efforts to silence dissent.”

The Intercept online newspaper earlier reported Energy Transfer Partners hired the private security firm of TigerSwan to gather information for the lawsuit via fake social media accounts and infiltration of protest camps.

=== The Arctic ===
Following Greenpeace USA's high-profile direct action, Shell Oil announced in 2015 it would abandon oil exploration in the Arctic. The oil company blamed declining oil prices for the decision, though Greenpeace USA attributed Shell's turn-around to pressure from environmentalists. Earlier, a group of Greenpeace USA activists had rappelled off a bridge in Portland, Oregon, in an effort to block a Shell oil drilling ship from leaving the city's port. .

=== Congress ===
==== Flotilla confronts Manchin ====
In 2021, Greenpeace USA joined a flotilla of kayaks and small boats outside of West Virginia senator Joe Manchin's yacht in Washington D.C. to draw attention to Manchin's refusal to support Congress' climate-friendly reconciliation package. In reference to President Biden's Build Back Better Plan, a critical part of the proposed $3.5 trillion reconciliation package, protesters in the Potomac waved signs that said "Don’t sink West Virginia,” “Manchin pass the bill,” “BBB brings jobs to WV” and “No climate no deal.”

==== Hot Seat ====
In 2008, Greenpeace's Project Hot Seat campaign aimed to pressure members of the United States Congress to implement policies to curb and cut greenhouse gas emissions, and what Phil Radford, then Greenpeace Executive Director, said was "going to be key to making the environmental movement into a viable political force in Congress and around the country."

=== Sting operations and investigations ===
==== Exxon Mobil executive on video ====
In 2021 Greenpeace's "Project Unearthed" released video clips of an Exxon Mobil executive revealing the oil company's lobbying tactics to weaken President Biden's infrastructure plan. Keith McCoy, Exxon Mobil's senior director for federal relations, told the press he was tricked by Greenpeace activists posing as job recruiters. On video, McCoy spoke about working with "shadow groups" to back a carbon tax he never thought would be imposed, as well as influencing senators to weaken climate provisions in Biden's plans. McCoy was taped calling Joe Manchin, the Democratic Senator from West Virginia, a "kingmaker" who McCoy talked to every week.

==== Academic sting operation ====
In 2015, the New York Times reported professors at Princeton and Pennsylvania State University got caught in a sting operation when Greenpeace employees, posing as energy company representatives, persuaded the professors to accept money to tout the benefits of coal and carbon emissions. Lawrence Carter, a Greenpeace employee involved in the sting, said the purpose of the charade was to “unravel the story” of industry's role in climate change denial.

=== Arms race ===
==== Star Wars protest at Vandenberg ====
In 2002, A federal judge sentenced Greenpeace protesters to one year probation for disrupting a "Star Wars" missile program at Vandenberg Air Force Base in Southern California. After reaching a deal with federal prosecutors, Greenpeace agreed to pay a $150,000 civil fine and refrain from further acts of civil disobedience at U.S. military bases involved in the missile program. Initially, the protesters had been charged with felonies for entering a restricted area at Vandenberg Air Force base, forcing a delay in the missile launch. Greenpeace USA opposes a space-based missile shield, arguing the Star Wars program escalates the arms race and increases the likelihood of nuclear war.

=== Plastics ===
==== Case against Walmart dismissed ====
In 2021, a U.S. District Court judge dismissed Greenpeace's lawsuit against Walmart, ruling the organization lacked legal standing. Greenpeace USA had charged that Walmart employs "unlawful, unfair, and deceptive business practices" in falsely labeling and promoting private-label plastic products as recyclable. Judge Maxine Chesney said Greenpeace USA lacked standing because the organization never believed Walmart's claims to begin with, and so therefore could not persuade the court that Greenpeace had been misled.

In response to the ruling, Greenpeace USA Oceans Campaign Director John Hocevar said, “Walmart failed to take action when we pointed out that they were labeling packaging as recyclable when it was headed for landfills and incinerators. When we finally took them to court, Walmart used a legal technicality to challenge our right to file rather than addressing the substance of the case.”

==== Research on single-use plastics ====
In 2021, Greenpeace released best to worst rankings on 20 grocery chains' elimination of single-use plastics that pollute the ocean. Stores with the best rankings were Giant Eagle, ALDI and Sprouts Farmers Market; the worst scorers were Wakefern, WinCo Foods and H-E-B. In general, Greenpeace was pessimistic, saying "U.S. retailers are moving at a snail’s pace" to dispense with single-use plastics that are hard to recycle." Two years after Greenpeace issued an initial dismal scorecard, stores began selling reusable grocery bags and offering biodegradable containers.

==== Coke and Pepsi leave plastics lobby ====
In 2019, in response to pressure from Greenpeace USA, both Coca-Cola and PepsiCo withdrew their membership in the Plastics Industry Association. The industry association had lobbied states to outlaw bans on plastic bottles.

==== Mattel ====
In 2011, less than a week after Greenpeace USA activists unfurled a banner outside of Mattel's El Segundo offices, the toymaker famous for its plastic Barbie and Ken dolls announced the company would investigate claims they use materials that contribute to rainforest destruction. In the meantime, the company said they instructed their packaging supplier to stop buying from a questionable supplier. During the protest, several participants hung themselves off the building to unfurl the banner that featured Barbie's boyfriend Ken breaking up with Barbie, saying, “Barbie: it’s over. I don’t date girls that are into deforestation.” Several of the protesters were arrested.

=== Deforestation ===
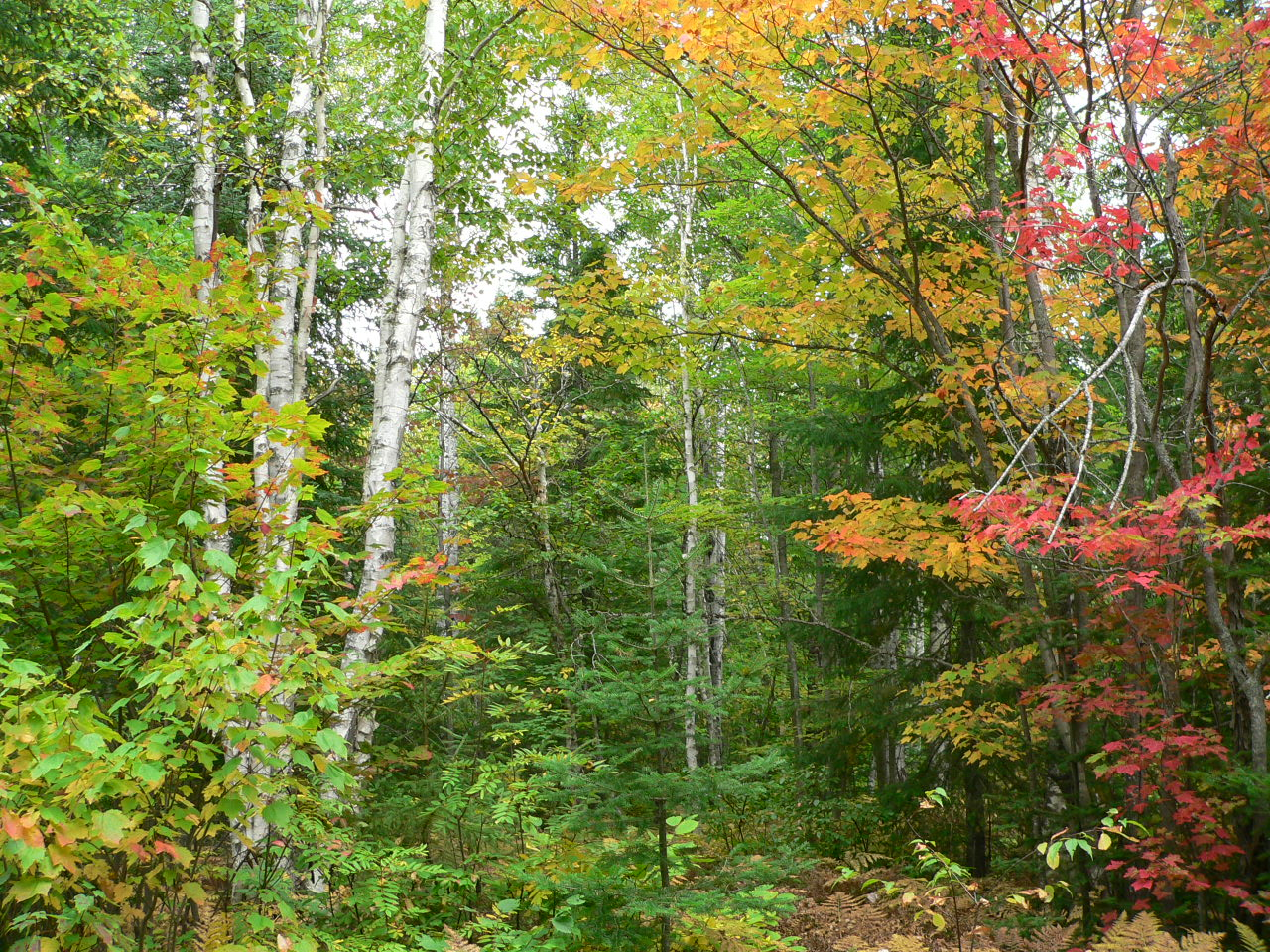
Boreal Forest, Canada.

==== Kimberly-Clark agrees to sustainable sourcing ====
After activists from Greenpeace USA and counterparts in Canada protested Kimberly-Clark's sourcing practices, the multi-million dollar paper products company (Kleenex, Scott, Cottonelle, Huggies) vowed in 2009 to preserve forests by obtaining wood fiber from "environmentally responsible sources, including recycled wood fiber." The company's announcement came on the heels of a five-year Greenpeace USA campaign objecting to the company's clear-cutting in Canada's Boreal Forest, the largest forest in the world, more vast than the Brazilian rainforest and critical for carbon storage. Protest actions had included sitting in at Kimberly Clark's headquarters in Massachusetts, blocking the company's production facility in Connecticut and publishing a New York Times ad suggesting that every time readers blew their nose with a Kleenex tissue they were destroying the Boreal Forest.

=== IRS audit ===
In 2006, after receiving complaints from Public Interest Watch Group, an organization funded, in part, by Exxon Mobil, the Internal Revenue Service conducted an audit of Greenpeace USA. Following the months-long audit, the IRS informed the environmental organization that it could continue to operate as a non-profit entity exempt from federal income taxes. John Passacantando, executive director of Greenpeace USA, said, "I believe organizations should be scrutinized and audited, but I just don't believe you should get targeted because ... you're a critic of Exxon Mobil." An oil company spokesman said Exxon Mobil had contributed to PIW, but that was not responsible for initiating the audit."

== Energy Transfer lawsuit ==
In 2025, a North Dakota jury ordered Greenpeace USA and affiliated entities—including Greenpeace Fund and Greenpeace International—to pay $666.8 million in damages to pipeline developer Energy Transfer, following a lawsuit related to the 2016–2017 Dakota Access Pipeline protests near the Standing Rock Sioux Reservation.

Greenpeace was found liable for defamation, trespass, nuisance, and civil conspiracy after the jury concluded the organization had supported and encouraged disruptive and, at times, violent demonstrations that delayed construction and harmed Energy Transfer’s business relationships. Greenpeace USA and Greenpeace Fund were held responsible for $535 million of the total damages.

Evidence presented during the trial included allegations that Greenpeace provided funding, equipment, and logistical support to activists at the protest site. Greenpeace has appealed the verdict, describing the case as a Strategic Lawsuit Against Public Participation (SLAPP) and a threat to free speech and environmental advocacy.

On February 27, 2026, Judge James Gion in North Dakota finalized the amount of damages at $345 million. Greenpeace had also filed a lawsuit against Energy Transfer in the Netherlands under a law designed to prevent lawsuits aimed at harassing or silencing activists.

== Personnel ==
=== Executive directors ===
- Richard Grossman
- 1988-1993 Peter Bahouth
- 1993-1997 Barbara Dudley
- 1997-2000 Kristen Engberg
- 2000-2008 John Passacantando
- 2009-2014 Phil Radford
- 2014–2022 Annie Leonard
- 2022-2024 - Ebony Martin Twilley
- 2024 - Rolf Skar
- 2024-Current - Sushma Raman

=== co-Executive directors ===
- 2014–present Annie Leonard
- 2021–present Ebony Twilley Martin

== See also ==
- Biodiversity
- Conservation Movement
- Conservation ethic
- Earth Science
- Ecology
- Ecosystem
- Environmental education
- Environmental movement
- Global warming
- Greenpeace
- Habitat conservation
- List of environmental organizations
- Nature
- Recycling
- Sustainability
- Timeline of environmental events
