= Alicia Cheng =

Asian-American graphic designer and educator

- Born: Ann Arbor, Michigan, U.S.
- Education: Barnard College; Yale University (MFA)
- Occupations: Graphic designer, educator
- Employer: The Metropolitan Museum of Art
- Known for: Cultural and museum design; ballot design history

Alicia Cheng is an American graphic designer, educator, and design leader best known for her work in cultural and museum design and for her book This Is What Democracy Looked Like: A Visual History of the Printed Ballot, the first illustrated history of ballot design in the United States. She is the Head of Design at The Metropolitan Museum of Art in New York City.

== Early life and education ==
Cheng is Asian-American. She was born and raised in Ann Arbor, Michigan. Her mother, Mignonette Yin Cheng, was a painter and a professor of painting at the University of Michigan School of Art. Cheng attended Barnard College and later earned a Master of Fine Arts in Graphic Design from Yale University.

== Career ==
Cheng began her career in publication design before expanding into exhibition design and work for cultural institutions. She was a senior designer at Method and served as co-design director at the Cooper Hewitt, Smithsonian Design Museum. Projects during this period included The Opulent Eye of Alexander Girard (2000), Russel Wright: Creating the American Lifestyle (2001), National Design Triennial: Inside Design Now (2003), and New Hotels for Global Nomads (2002).

In the early 2000s, Cheng co-founded MGMT with Sarah Gephart, a collaborative, women-owned design studio based in Brooklyn. The studio focused on exhibition design, museum publications, branding, print, and data visualization for cultural institutions. MGMT worked with clients including The New York Times (A Year in Iraq, 2005–2008), the Carnegie Museum of Art (Silver to Steel: The Modern Designs of Peter Muller Munk, 2015), the International Center of Photography (Weegee, 2012), the National Building Museum (Intelligent Cities, 2011), the Queen Sirikit Museum of Textiles (2008), the Museum of Chinese in America (2009, with Maya Lin), the New York Public Library (J. D. Salinger, 2019), and former U.S. Vice President Al Gore (An Inconvenient Truth, Melcher Media, 2006).

In 2021, Cheng was appointed Head of Design at The Metropolitan Museum of Art, where she leads the team responsible for exhibition design, permanent galleries, and institutional communications. Her work at the Met includes the multi-year renovation of the Michael C. Rockefeller Wing, the reinstallation of the European Paintings galleries, the installation Before Yesterday We Could Fly: An Afrofuturist Period Room (2021), and special exhibitions including Karl Lagerfeld: A Line of Beauty (2023), Manet/Degas (2023), Siena: The Rise of Painting, 1300–1350 (2024), and Monstrous Beauty: A Feminist Revision of Chinoiserie (2025).

== Teaching and criticism ==
Cheng is an educator and critic. She has served as an external critic for the Master of Fine Arts program at the Rhode Island School of Design and has taught or lectured at institutions including Yale University, the Maryland Institute College of Art, and the Cooper Union School of Art.

== Publications and other work ==
In 2020, Cheng published This Is What Democracy Looked Like: A Visual History of the Printed Ballot, accompanied by a window exhibition at the Cooper Union. The book received wide critical attention, with coverage in The New Yorker, The Washington Post, The Boston Globe, CBS News, PBS, and Hyperallergic. Library Journal described the book as “a truly interdisciplinary work,” praising its use of nearly 200 historical ballots to examine the democratic process.

In 2024, Cheng was appointed to the United States Postal Service's Citizens' Stamp Advisory Committee.

== Personal life ==
Cheng lives in Brooklyn with her husband, novelist and Emmy-nominated producer Michael Rubens.
