= Annie Leonard =

American filmmaker and activist

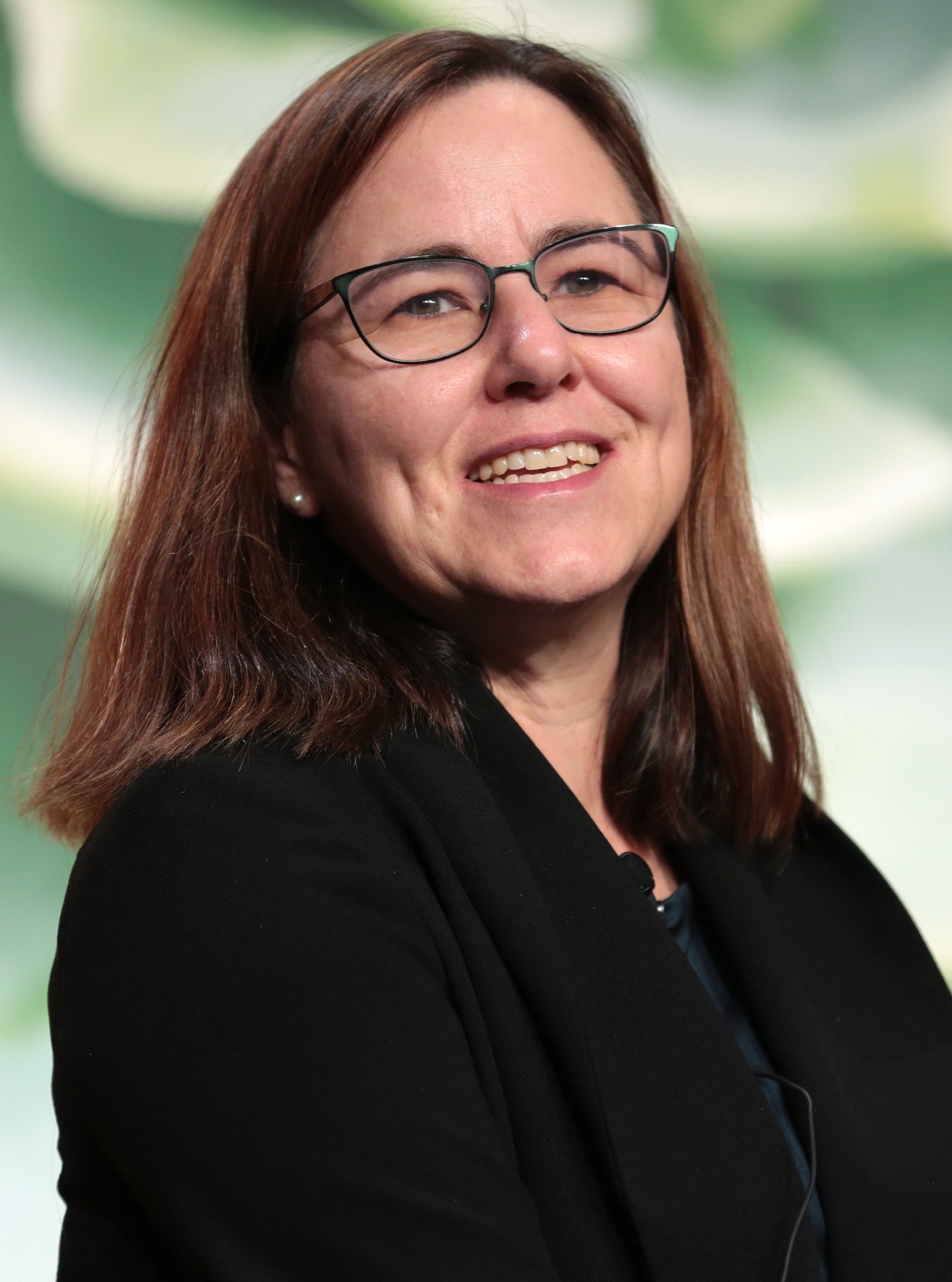
- Leonard in February 2018
- Born: Anne Louise Leonard; 1964 (age 61–62); Seattle, Washington
- Education: Cornell University
- Occupations: filmmaker, activist
- Children: 1
- Writing career
- Genres: Consumerism, Ecology
- Notable work: The Story of Stuff
- Website: storyofstuff.org

Annie Marie Leonard (born 1964) is an American environmentalist and anti-consumerism activist. Leonard created the 2007 animated film The Story of Stuff, which describes the life cycle of material goods. In 2014, she became the executive director of Greenpeace USA.

== Early life and education ==
Leonard was born in Seattle, Washington, where she also grew up. She graduated from the Lakeside School, and received an undergraduate degree from Barnard College in 1987 and a graduate degree from Cornell University in City and Regional Planning.

== Career ==
After interning at the National Wildlife Federation in the late 1980s, Leonard began working with Greenpeace International on a campaign to ban international waste dumping, traveling around the world to track garbage and hazardous waste sent from developed countries to less developed countries. "I was sneaking into the factories where it was being disposed, interviewing the workers, taking hair samples and soil samples to prove the environmental health harm," she later explained in an interview with Cornell University.

In 1992, Leonard testified in front of the US Congress on the topic of international waste trafficking. The work of Greenpeace and other organizations led to the 1992 Basel Convention, an international treaty to protect less developed countries from the dumping of hazardous waste by transnational corporations based in developed countries.

Leonard is well known as the creator and narrator of the 2007 animated documentary film about the life cycle of material goods, The Story of Stuff. The documentary began as an hour-long talk, and was made into a condensed film version based on popular demand. She also wrote a book version of the film, published in 2010 in the United States by Free Press of Simon & Schuster, in the UK by Constable & Robinson, and in Germany by Econ Verlag.

After The Story of Stuff, she created The Story of Cap and Trade (2009), which addresses emissions trading. Subsequent productions include The Story of Bottled Water, The Story of Cosmetics, The Story of Electronics, The Story of Citizens United v. FEC, The Story of Broke, The Story of Change, and The Story of Solutions.

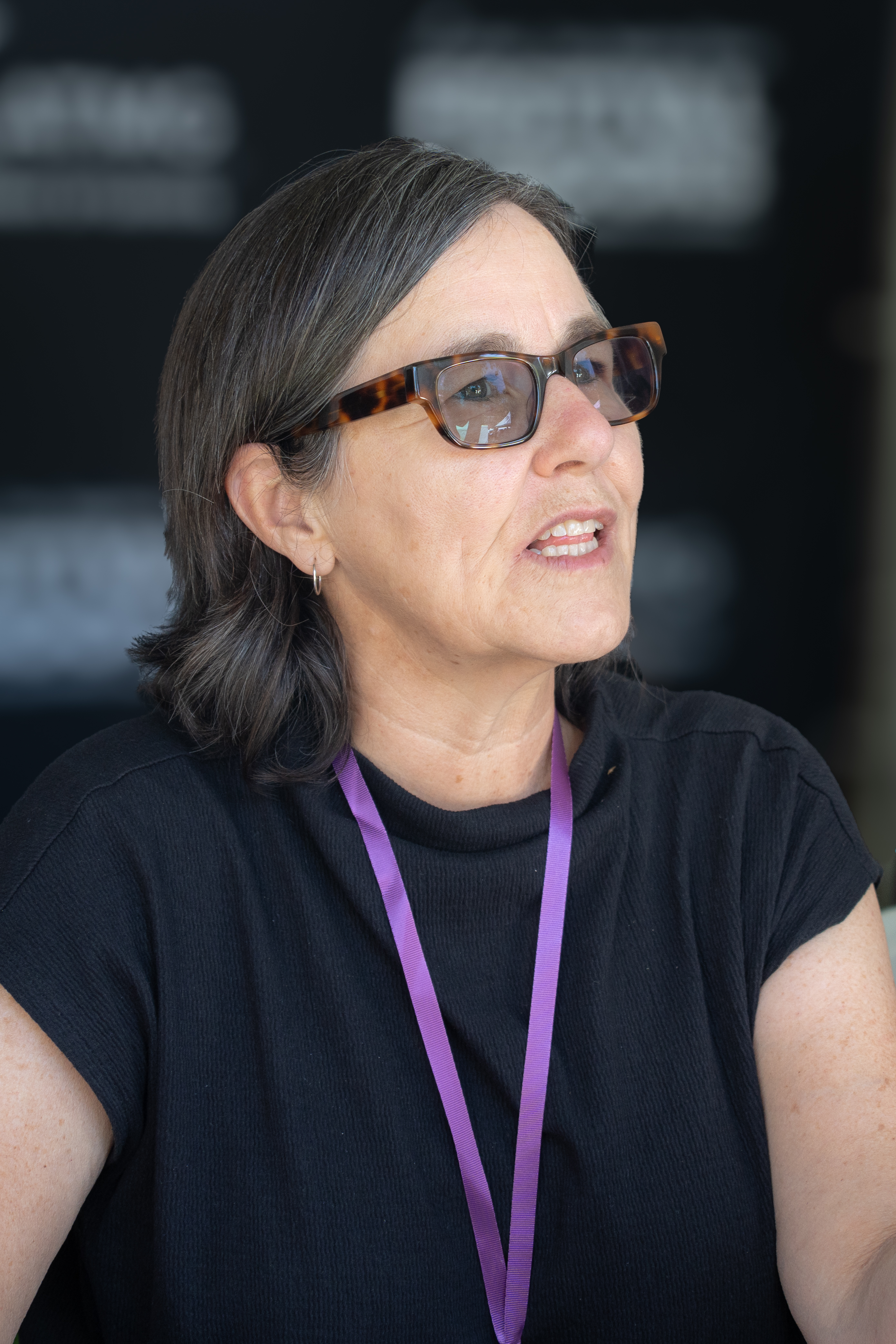
Leonard at the 2026 Los Angeles Times Festival of Books

In addition to her work on the Story of Stuff films, Leonard was co-creator and coordinator of GAIA (the Global Alliance for Incinerator Alternatives), serving on the boards of International Forum on Globalization (IFG) and the Environmental Health Fund. She previously worked for Health Care Without Harm, Essential Information, and Greenpeace International, and was coordinator of the Funders Workgroup for Sustainable Production and Consumption.

Leonard was named the executive director of Greenpeace USA in May 2014.

In March 2022, Leonard and climate activist Jane Fonda co-founded the Jane Fonda Climate PAC (political action committee).

== Book ==
Leonard and fellow activist André Carothers collaborated on writing and editing a book titled Protest: Respect It. Defend It. Use It., which was published by Patagonia in April 2026. The book relates the stories of more than 40 protest actions, dating back to 1738, and covering a wide range of issues. These accounts are interspersed with essays by notable activists, along with an afterword by former Secretary of Labor Robert Reich. Kirkus Reviews said the book was "An excellent introduction to the power of public dissent."

== Personal life ==
Leonard lives in the San Francisco Bay Area with her daughter Dewi, born in 1999.
