= Sustainable Table =

Sustainable Table was created in 2003 by the nonprofit organization GRACE to help consumers understand the problems with food supply and offer viable solutions and alternatives from sustainable agriculture. Rather than be overwhelmed by the problems created by the industrial agricultural system, Sustainable Table celebrates the joy of food and eating from sustainable food systems.

Today’s dominant form of agriculture relies on synthetic fertilizers and chemical pesticides, large amounts of water, major transportation systems and factory-style practices for raising livestock and crops. Artificial hormones in milk, antibiotic-resistant bacteria, mad cow disease, and large-scale outbreaks of potentially deadly E. coli are all associated with this industrial form of food production.

Sustainable agriculture involves food production methods that are healthy, do not harm the environment, respect workers, are humane to animals, provide fair wages to farmers, and support farming communities. But rather than focus on the problems, Sustainable Table promotes the positive shift toward local, small-scale sustainable farming.

The program is home to the Eat Well Guide, an online directory of sustainable products in the U.S. and Canada, and the critically acclaimed, award-winning Meatrix movies - The Meatrix, The Meatrix II: Revolting and The Meatrix II½. Sustainable Table celebrates local sustainable food, educates consumers on food-related issues and works to build community through food.

== See also ==
- Ethical eating
- Local food
- Sustainable agriculture
