= Free range (disambiguation) =

Free range is a method of farming and animal husbandry.

Free range may refer to:

- Free Range Graphics, film studio
- Free Range Studios, film studio
- Free Range (film), a 2013 Estonian film
- Free Ranger, an air character from Skylanders: Swap Force
- "Free Range" (song), a 1992 song by The Fall
- Free Range (comic)
- Free Range (musician)

== See also ==
- Free range eggs
- Free-range parenting
- Free roam (disambiguation)
