= Michael Rubens =

American comedian and author

- Education: Wesleyan University
- Occupations: Producer and author
- Known for: Full Frontal with Samantha Bee

Michael Rubens (also sometimes known as Mike Rubens) is an American comedian and author.

== Career ==
=== Television ===
Rubens worked as a producer and correspondent for the television program Full Frontal with Samantha Bee. He received two Primetime Emmy Award nominations: Outstanding Variety Talk Series in 2020 as a producer, and Outstanding Writing for a Variety Special in 2018 for Full Frontal with Samantha Bee Presents: The Great American Puerto Rico (It’s Complicated). He has covered stories from the southern boarder, climate change, and Jeb Bush’s doomed 2016 presidential bid. He also worked as a field producer for The Daily Show with Jon Stewart and for Last Week Tonight with John Oliver.

As a television writer and producer, Rubens has worked for AOL Studios, CNNfn, The New York Times, Oxygen, and Travel Channel.

=== Author ===
Rubens is the author of four novels. His debut novel, The Sheriff of Yrnameer (Pantheon, 2009), was described by Stephen Colbert as “a science fiction book your grandmother will love — if she’s a lustful, violent lady.” Publishers Weekly called the novel “a rocket-fast, knee-slapping narrative" that is "lighthearted and adventure-filled.”

His second novel, Sons of the 613 (Clarion Books, 2012), was selected by Kirkus Reviews, the Young Adult Library Services Association, and Tablet magazine as one of the year’s best books and received a perfect score of 10 from Voice of Youth Advocates.

His third novel, The Bad Decisions Playlist (Clarion Books, 2016), received positive reviews from School Library Journal, Booklist, Publishers Weekly, and Kirkus Reviews, and was optioned by Fox Broadcasting Company for a television adaptation. School Library Journal described the novel as “a fun, smart, at times heartbreaking read about families, love, choices, consequences, and the power of music,” while Booklist called it “an infectious read” and praised its “heart.”

His fourth novel, Emily and the Spellstone (HarperCollins, 2017), is a young adult fantasy novel.

Rubens’s essays and humor writing have appeared in The New Yorker Daily Shouts, McSweeney’s Internet Tendency, HuffPost Comedy, and Salon.

== Personal life ==
Rubens lives in Brooklyn with his wife, the graphic designer Alicia Cheng.
