= Ivan Cash =

Ivan Cash is an American interactive artist, filmmaker, and speaker. His work celebrates human connection and explores themes of belonging in the 21st century. In 2016, Cash was named a Forbes 30 Under 30 Artist, and in 2018 was appointed a member of the USPS Citizens' Stamp Advisory Committee.

== Career ==
=== Occupy George ===
In 2011, Cash and co-creator Andy Dao stamped fact-based infographics onto dollar bills to inform the public about America's wealth disparity.

Occupy George exhibited in museums and festivals around the world, including the Victoria & Albert Museum in London, the YBCA in San Francisco, the Brooklyn Museum, and Ars Electronica in Austria.

In 2014, Cash and Dao were commissioned by the Victoria & Albert Museum to design stamps about the UK's wealth disparity on the £5 note. This stamp became an interactive component at the Disobedient Objects exhibit.

=== Snail Mail My Email ===
Snail Mail My Email is a community art project that lasted from 2011 to 2017, where volunteers transformed strangers’ emails into handwritten letters, free of charge.

2,000 volunteers artistically interpreted and sent 29,249 letters to 80 countries throughout the span of the project.

The project later was published as a book of the same name.

=== Selfless Portraits ===
In 2013, Cash and co-creator Jeff Greenspan launched collaborative art project Selfless Portraits, where strangers across the world drew each other's Facebook profile pics. Over 50,000 drawings were submitted from 153 countries during the project's 3-year span between 2013 and 2015.

=== No-Tech Zone ===
In 2015, Cash designed and installed official-looking ‘No-Tech Zone’ signs in parks across San Francisco. The signs encouraged passersby to question the role technology plays in people's lives and the environment.

=== IRL Glasses ===
In 2018, Cash launched IRL Glasses, a pair of glasses that block screens, to catalyze a conversation about human's relationship to technology. The crowdfunding campaign raised $140,000 in one month from over 2,000 Kickstarter backers. IRL Glasses were a Kickstarter staff pick and a FastCompany World Changing Ideas Finalist in 2019.

== Awards ==
- 2019 FastCompany World Changing Ideas Finalist
- 2019 Adweek Creative 100
- 2018 Kickstarter Staff Pick
- 2016 Forbes ‘30 Under 30’ Artist
- 2016 Brooklyn Museum Exhibit
- 2015 Print "New Visual Artist" (15 Under 30)
- 2015 Vimeo Staff Pick
- 2014 Jury ADC Young Guns
- 2014 Original Art Commission, V&A Museum
- 2014 Webby Honoree
- 2014 Vimeo Staff Pick
- 2014 Webby Official Nominee
- 2013 Jury ADC Young Guns
- 2012 ADC Young Guns Award
- 2012 Webby Nominee
- 2012 Cannes Lions, Shortlist
- 2010 Fabrica Fellowship Award

== Filmography ==
- Last Photo Project, 2013–2015
- Howard's Farm, 2014
- Agent of Connection, 2017
