= The Matrix Revolutions (score) =

The Matrix Revolutions: Limited 2-CD set Edition

Soundtrack album by Don Davis
- Released: February 25, 2014
- Recorded: August 11–15 and 18–21, and September 10, 2003; Newman Scoring Stage, 20th Century Fox (Los Angeles, California)
- Genre: Film score
- Length: 128:49
- Label: LaLaLand Records
- Producer: Don Davis

The Matrix Revolutions: Limited Edition (2-CD Set) is a score album to the 2003 film The Matrix Revolutions by Don Davis. It was officially released on February 25, 2014. This release includes almost the entire film's score on two discs.

== Track listing ==
Disc 1
No.	Title	Writer(s)	Length
1.	"Logos/Main Title"	Don Davis	1:24
2.	"Nothing But Blue Pills/AK, Colt, and Mauser/Our Lit Ovens"	Don Davis	2:24
3.	"Oracle Debacle"	Don Davis	1:38
4.	"Rama-Kandra/The Trainman Cometh"	Juno Reactor and Don Davis	2:42
5.	"The Trainman Goeth"	Don Davis	1:50
6.	"Tetsujin"	Juno Reactor and Don Davis	3:23
7.	"The Road to Hell/Time's Up/The Road to Sourceville"	Don Davis	5:46
8.	"He Is You"	Don Davis	1:36
9.	"The First Goodbye/The All-Knowing Oracle"	Don Davis	5:32
10.	"The Logos Location/It's Crazy Zee"	Don Davis	5:08
11.	"Das Banegold/The Bane Revelation"	Don Davis	8:08
12.	"The Smith Within Us"	Don Davis	6:05
13.	"Men in Metal"	Don Davis	2:22
14.	"Niobe's Run/The Breach/Boom Hilda"	Don Davis	6:52
15.	"Die Brünett Walküre/Mjölnir Mastication/Charra Broiled"	Don Davis vs. Juno Reactor	4:46
16.	"Woman Can Drive/Moribund Mifune"	Don Davis	6:33
Total length:			1:06:22

Disc 2
No.	Title	Writer(s)	Length
1.	"Kidfried/To Our Snivel"	Don Davis	6:19
2.	"Neovision"	Don Davis	3:20
3.	"Saw Bitch Workhorse"	Don Davis	4:00
4.	"Trinity Definitely"	Don Davis	4:17
5.	"Deus Ex Machina"	Don Davis	5:06
6.	"Neodämmerung"	Don Davis	6:00
7.	"Why, Mr. Anderson?/Spirit of the Universe"	Don Davis	7:11
8.	"Bridge of Immortality/For Neo"	Don Davis	4:59
9.	"Navras"	Juno Reactor and Don Davis	9:08
10.	"The Trainman Cometh (original version)"	Don Davis	2:43
11.	"Die Brünett Walküre (alternate)"	Don Davis	2:13
12.	"For Neo (extended ending)"	Don Davis	3:04
13.	"In My Head"	Pale 3	3:48
Total length:			1:02:27

Composed, conducted and orchestrated by Don Davis. Performed by The Hollywood Studio Symphony.
