= The Matrix Resurrections (soundtrack) =

The Matrix Resurrections: (Original Motion Picture Soundtrack)

Soundtrack album by Johnny Klimek and Tom Tykwer
- Released: December 17, 2021
- Genres: soundtrack, Film score
- Length: 2:26:59
- Label: WaterTower
- Producers: Johnny Klimek and Tom Tykwer

Singles from The Matrix Resurrections (Original Motion Picture Soundtrack)
- 1. "Neo and Trinity Theme (Johnny Klimek & Tom Tykwer Exomorph Remix)" Released: December 10, 2021

The Matrix Resurrections (Original Motion Picture Soundtrack) is a 2021 soundtrack album from the film, The Matrix Resurrections. WaterTower released the album on December 22, 2021.

== Development ==
In September 2021, Warner Bros. confirmed that Johnny Klimek and Tom Tykwer would be scoring the film, having previously collaborated with Wachowski on Sense8 and Cloud Atlas, replacing Don Davis, who composed the score for the first three films, though Klimek and Tykwer feature themes and material written by Davis for the original Matrix films.

The soundtrack was released on December 17, 2021. A track from the album titled "Neo and Trinity Theme (Johnny Klimek & Tom Tykwer Exomorph Remix)" was released as a single on December 10.

== Track listing ==
All music composed by Johnny Klimek and Tom Tykwer except where otherwise noted.

Disc 1
No.	Title	Writer(s)	Length
1.	"Opening – The Matrix Resurrections"	Klimek; Tykwer; Don Davis^{[a]}	5:22
2.	"Two and the Same"		5:34
3.	"Meeting Trinity"		1:52
4.	"It's in My Mind"		4:24
5.	"I Fly or I Fall"		3:15
6.	"Set and Setting"		2:36
7.	"Into the Train"	Klimek; Tykwer; Marcel Dettmann	2:37
8.	"Exit the Pod"		2:51
9.	"The Dojo"	Klimek; Tykwer; Davis^{[a]}	3:44
10.	"Enter IO"	Klimek; Tykwer; Justin Bell	3:12
11.	"Inside IO"		3:37
12.	"Escape"	Klimek; Tykwer; Gene Pritsker	2:16
13.	"Broadcast Depth"		2:54
14.	"Exiles"	Klimek; Tykwer; Pritsker	2:44
15.	"Factory Fight"	Klimek; Tykwer; Davis^{[a]}	3:47
16.	"Bullet Time"		4:54
17.	"Recruiting"	Klimek; Tykwer; Pritsker	3:14
18.	"Infiltration"	Klimek; Tykwer; Bell	2:40
19.	"I Like Tests"		2:31
20.	"I Can't Be Her"		2:43
21.	"Simulatte Brawl"	Klimek; Tykwer; Davis^{[a]}	3:05
22.	"Swarm"	Klimek; Tykwer; Davis^{[a]}	3:36
23.	"Sky Scrape"		1:46
24.	"My Dream Ended Here"	Klimek; Tykwer; Davis^{[a]}	3:16
Total length:			1:17:20

- ^{^a} Track contains excerpts from The Matrix courtesy of Don Davis.

Disc 2
No.	Title	Length
1.	"Neo and Trinity Theme (Johnny Klimek & Tom Tykwer Exomorph Remix)"	5:47
2.	"Opening – The Matrix Resurrections (Alessandro Adriani Remix)"	6:19
3.	"My Dream Ended Here (Marcel Dettmann Remix)"	6:18
4.	"Nosce (Almost Falling Remix)"	4:00
5.	"Bullet Time (Moderna Remix)"	6:28
6.	"Back to the Matrix (Eclectic Youth Remix)"	5:16
7.	"Welcome to the Crib (System 01 Remix)"	6:48
8.	"Flowing (Thomas Fehlmann Remix)"	8:26
9.	"Temet (Esther Silex & Kotelett Remix)"	8:13
10.	"Choice (Psychic Health Remix)"	5:29
11.	"Monumental (Gudrun Gut Remix)"	7:07
Total length:		1:09:39

== Personnel ==
- Johnny Klimek and Tom Tykwer - Composers, Album Producers
- Lana Wachowski - Executive Album Producer
- Gene Pritsker, Justin Bell, Gabriel Mounsey, Marcel Dettmann - Additional Music
- Robert Ames and Hugh Brunt - Conductors
- Gabriel Mounsey - Supervising Music Editor
- Hans Hafner and Jonathan Shanes - Music Editors
- Gene Pritsker - Lead Orchestrator
- Justin Bell - Orchestrator
- Justin Bell, Hans Hafner, Fabio Senna, Valerio Mina - Score Programmers
- Howard Scarr, Urs Heckmann, Viktor Weimer - Synth Programmers
- Gabriel Mounsey - Score Mixer
- Guacimara De Elizaga and Harry George - Music Coordinators

== See also ==
- "White Rabbit", 1967 song
