= Sylvia Harris =

African-American graphic designer (1953–2011)

- Born: Sylvia Elizabeth Harris; 1953; Richmond, Virginia, U.S.
- Died: July 24, 2011 (aged 57–58); Washington, D.C., U.S.
- Occupations: Graphic designer; design strategist
- Spouse: Gary Singer
- Children: 1

Sylvia Elizabeth Harris Singer (1953 – July 24, 2011) was an African-American graphic designer and design strategist. She has been considered a pioneer in the field of social impact design. The Sylvia Harris Citizen Design Award was named in her memory by the American Institute of Graphic Arts.

== Early life ==
Sylvia Elizabeth Harris was born in Richmond, Virginia, in 1953, to Thomas "Tricky Tom" Harris. Her father was a women's basketball coach at Virginia Union University and her mother was an art teacher and artist. As she grew she experienced racism and attended a desegregated high school. Harris has stated that she remembers her mother shouting from her car at the Ku Klux Klan while they were displaying on the street. Her experience as a young black woman growing up during desegregation in the South instilled in her a strong belief in social justice that can be seen through her artwork. She graduated from John Marshall High School in 1971. Harris went on to attend Virginia Commonwealth University, where she graduated with a BFA in communication art and design with an undergraduate focus in film and photography in 1975. Harris attended graduate school at the Yale School of Art, where she graduated with an MFA in 1980.

== Early career ==
Harris moved to Boston after college and worked at WGBH-TV. This was a formative time for Harris and led to her discovery of graphic design as a career path. Harris began working at Washington Business Group on Health, where Chris Pullman mentored her. Her second position was at Architects Collaborative working on environmental graphics. On Pullman's advice she left Architects Collaborative to go back to school. She graduated with a Master of Fine Arts in graphic design from Yale University.

After graduating she co-founded Two Twelve Associates, Inc. with classmates David Gibson and Juanita Dugdale in 1980. Based in New York City, Two Twelve Associates designed work for some of the nation's largest hospitals. universities, and civic agencies through systems planning, policy development, and innovation management. The firm became known for a term that Harris coined, "public information design" which embodies Harris' work for the rest of her career. During this time she did design work for a big client, Citibank. The firm worked to help design their first ATM. Another large client that Two Twelve Associates did work for was the Central Park Zoo. They helped the zoo redo different displays and present information more effectively. While working at Two Twelve Associates, Harris found a passion for designing public information systems in a comprehensive and effective way.

In 1994, she left Two Twelve Associates to form Sylvia Harris LLC. She focused on using design to solve problems for civic agencies, universities, and hospitals. She led her company with a mindset that made her workers truly care about the people for whom they were designing. She emphasized to her designers that the work they were doing had a big impact on her client's lives.

She renamed Sylvia Harris LLC "Citizen Research and Design" while the company's focus shifted toward a design process driven by public research. In 2011 she co-founded the non-profit Public Policy Lab "committed to the more effective delivery of public services to the American people."

== Works ==
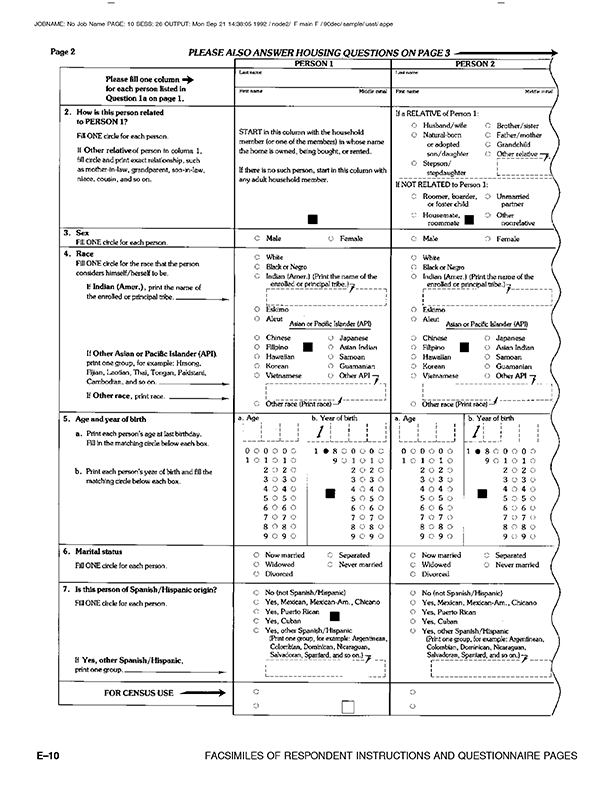
1990 US Census Form

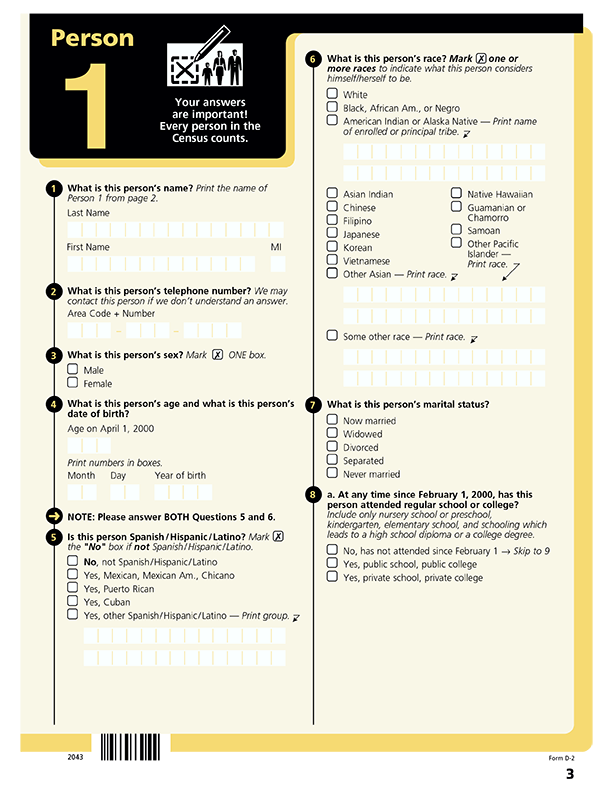
2000 US Census Form

Previous design (left) compared to Harris' redesign (right)

=== 2000 United States Census ===
Harris was the creative director behind the design of the 2000 Census for the United States Census Bureau. The goal of the 1998 user-centered form redesign was to encourage Americans, including those who were previously underrepresented citizens, to participate. Harris led a team consisting of Yale Graduate Design students, Two Twelve Associates, and Don Dillman in creating an effective and effective survey that would produce effective results.

=== New York-Presbyterian/Columbia Medical Center ===
Sylvia Harris was hired as an independent project leader to design more effective communication with patients of New York-Presbyterian and Columbia University Medical Center. This project emerged because of a 2001 New York-Presbyterian/Columbia survey that showed the majority of first-time patients got lost trying to get to their appointments. The reason patients got lost: poor signage, lack of funding for replacing outdated signage, accessibility issues (especially regarding the spectrum of individual physical needs), and bureaucratic red tape. Harris broke each project down into five steps. The first step: assessment, or getting to the cause of the problem. The second: management, making sure project scope is under control. Next: coming up with a strategy to fix the problem(s), then comes the actual design of the components of the solution. This step is often ongoing. Finally, implementation, meaning the process of negotiating with any stakeholders for final approval.

1. Assessment
2. Management
3. Strategy
4. Design
5. Implementation

== Personal life ==
Harris married Gary Singer, with whom she had one daughter, Thai. She died on July 24, 2011. She had collapsed three days prior while attending a meeting in Washington, D.C. and was taken to George Washington University Hospital, where she later died due to heart problems.

== Awards and legacy ==
In 2014, Harris was awarded the American Institute of Graphic Arts medal. In 2012, the American Institute of Graphic Arts created the Sylvia Harris Citizen Design Award, which honors a professional designer who has created a project that enhances public life.
