= Open Range Communications =

Open Range Communications was a Colorado-based telecommunication company providing wireless broadband infrastructure for rural communities. The company developed and marketed WiMAX (Worldwide Interoperability for Microwave Access) network products. In 2008 it was awarded a $267 million loan from the Rural Utilities Service’s broadband program to supply broadband services (of which $73.5 million was provided to the company) in addition to $100 million in finance from JP Morgan Chase. The company filed for bankruptcy on October 6, 2011.

== Broadband provision ==
The company was incorporated in 2004 and was headquartered in Greenwood Village, Colorado. On 9 January 2009, the company announced an investment of $100 million from One Equity Partners (OEP), the private equity arm of JP Morgan Chase.

In March 2008, the United States Department of Agriculture's Rural Development Utilities Program (RDUP) approved a $267 million Broadband Access Loan for Open Range, with the prerequisite that private financing also be secured. The OEP investment satisfied the RDUP's loan terms, making the funds available to Open Range.

== Bankruptcy ==
Open Range Communications voluntarily filed for Chapter 11 bankruptcy protection on 6 October 2011 in the United States Bankruptcy Court for the District of Delaware. In court filings, the company stated that it intended to use the bankruptcy process to "effectuate either (i) a section 363 sale of substantially all of its assets as a going concern or sales for select assets; or, (ii) a wind-down of its business operations through a liquidation in chapter 11." The company ceased operation soon after.

The company later asked the court to transfer the case to Chapter 7 of the code saying it had, "no realistic chance to rehabilitate the business" after a bankruptcy bidder (that had shown interest in buying the company's assets) withdrew.

The company's bankruptcy left the US Government with liabilities for $73.5 million in unpaid loans. The House Energy and Commerce Committee has since launched an investigation into the company's collapse.
