= Free Range Studios =

Free Range
- Company type: Private
- Industry: Brand consulting and marketing
- Founded: Washington, D.C. (1999)
- Headquarters: San Francisco, California; Boston, Massachusetts
- Key people: Jonah Sachs (founder); Paul Hammond
- Website: FreeRange.com

Free Range is an American brand-consulting storytelling company founded in 1999 that is based in San Francisco, California, and Boston, Massachusetts. It has entrepreneurs, designers, academics, and researchers. Its clients range from the for-profit, NGO, and government sectors around the world.

== Films ==
The firm produced the award-winning 2003 animated short film, The Meatrix, an animal-rights parody of the 1999 film The Matrix. It and its two short 2006 sequels, The Meatrix II: Revolting and The Meatrix II 1/2, were set in factory farms and a slaughterhouse and were commissioned projects for the GRACE Communications Foundation.

== Books ==
In July 2012, Free Range founder Jonah Sachs published his first book with Harvard Business Review Press, Winning the Story Wars: Why Those Who Tell -- and Live -- the Best Stories Will Rule the Future. In Winning the Story Wars, Sachs argues that brands that tell value-driven stories can truly revolutionize marketing. In 2018, Sachs released his second book, Unsafe Thinking, which explains "how to be nimble and bold when you need it most".
