= The Meatrix =

2003 parody animation short

- Promotional poster
- Directed by: Louis Fox
- Written by: Louis Fox; Jonah Sachs
- Produced by: Free Range Studios; GRACE
- Starring: Louis Fox
- Music by: Louis Fox
- Production company: Free Range Studios
- Release date: November 3, 2003
- Running time: 4 minutes
- Country: United States
- Language: English

The Meatrix is a short flash animation critical of factory farming and industrial agricultural practices. It has been translated into more than 30 languages and watched by more than 30 million people. A parody of The Matrix series by Warner Bros. Entertainment, it was made by the green messaging firm Free Range Studios in 2003 as a commissioned project for the Grace Communications Foundation. Two sequels were released in 2006, The Meatrix II: Revolting, and The Meatrix II ½.

== Plot ==
In a dark satire of the 1999 film The Matrix, Leo, a pig on a seemingly bucolic family farm, is approached by Moopheus, an anthropomorphic bull. Moopheus shows Leo that the farm he has known is an illusion and that he is really trapped in a horrific factory farm. Leo and Moopheus then work to break out of the Meatrix and help others do the same with the help of a third character, Chickity. The animated short aims to encourage consumers to purchase organic food products and free-range meats.

== Awards ==
The Meatrix won a number of awards, including a 2005 Webby and the Annecy 2004 Netsurfers Award for Short Films. Free Range Studios claims that over 15 million people have viewed The Meatrix, and it has been translated, either dubbed or subtitled, into 40 languages. The Meatrix and its two sequels were included as bonus material on the DVD for the 2006 film Fast Food Nation.
