= Psychon =

Psychon may refer to:

- Psychon (neurology), unit of mental activity proposed by McCulloch and Pitts in 1943
- Psychon, a fictional planet from Space: 1999
- Psychon, a concept proposed by parapsychologist Whately Carington in his 1945 book Telepathy

== See also ==
- Lords of the Psychon, a 1963 novel by Daniel F. Galouye
- Psychonomic Society
  - Psychon Bull Rev, or Psychonomic Bulletin & Review
