= A Scourge of Screamers =

1968 novel by Daniel F. Galouye

- First edition cover, New York, 1968
- Author: Daniel F. Galouye
- Cover artist: Paul Lehr
- Language: English
- Series: A Bantam Book, F3585
- Genre: Science fiction
- Publisher: Bantam Books
- Publication date: 1968
- Publication place: United States
- English publication date: 1968
- Media type: Print (paperback)
- Pages: 172 pp
- OCLC: 7343960
- Dewey Decimal: 813/.5/4
- LC Class: PS3557.A42 S36 1968
- Preceded by: Simulacron 3 (1964)
- Followed by: The Infinite Man (1973)

A Scourge of Screamers is a science fiction novel by Daniel F. Galouye. It was originally published in 1968. It was published in the United Kingdom under the alternate title Lost Perception.

== Plot introduction ==
The story revolves around a spaceflight engineer working for SecBu, the former United Nations Security Bureau which is the only remaining government after a nuclear exchange eliminated all national governments two years before. The exchange is said to have been caused by a Russian who "went Screamie" while at the controls of the missiles on a nuclear submarine. The Screamies is a new disease afflicting people at random around the world. Victims collapse, screaming at visions only they can see.

Strange people plotting against SecBu are revealed to be aliens. SecBu begins a campaign blaming the Screamies on the aliens. The truth however, is much more complex. Earth is emerging into a field of radiation which allows the mind to perceive the world in incredible detail at levels from the microscopic upward. The effect is like that of having functioning eyes, but being raised in darkness until suddenly emerging into daylight (a theme explored also in Galouye's first novel, Dark Universe).

It eventually becomes clear that SecBu is run by people who conquered the Screamies, and are bent on using their enhanced perceptions to gain and hold power. The protagonist is tempted by the power brokers at SecBu, who need his skills, while a close friend sides with the aliens who are attempting to help mankind learn to live with the new perception.

== Plot summary ==
The novel opens in 1997, two years after the nuclear exchange. The "Screamies" have been afflicting humanity since the 1980s.

Arthur Gregson, an American spaceflight engineer, and his close friend Kenneth Wellford, from England, are attacked by an odd flying craft while themselves flying a small plane to a meeting in Rome. They evade their attacker long enough for SecBu military craft to arrive and shoot it down. The experience is too much for Gregson, however, who has to pretend to check out another part of the plane so he can endure yet another of his intermittent Screamie attacks.

Finally reaching their destination, they meet the head of SecBu, Weldon Radcliff, and are shown the corpse of an alien. It is definitely not human, having no hair, no fingernails, and most tellingly, an elaborate double heart. Greg's twin brother Manuel had gone out on the first operational starship, the Nina, which was lost after sending messages about "a glowing ship" and "presences". Radcliff informs Greg and Kenneth that they believe the Nina was attacked by aliens, who are now on Earth and are responsible for the Screamies in some way. A human accomplice of the aliens apparently calls them "Valorians". The particular alien they are shown attempted to assassinate a SecBu official.

Back in New York City, Gregson and Wellford are caught up in yet another assassination attempt on an official, and Gregson recognizes one of the assailants as a Valorian. Giving pursuit, he is halted by a Screamie attack after the Valorian reaches into his pocket to activate a device of some kind.

While visiting his fiancée Helen Forsythe and her father in rural Pennsylvania, Gregson follows up on an article in a local newspaper about a farmer who claimed that aliens tried to recruit him to help them. He runs into a group of men and an alien at the farmhouse who interrogate him until SecBu troops arrive. Strangely the men know him and refer to Helen as if she had been working with them.

Summoned to London with Wellford for another SecBu briefing, Gregson hears that Wellford was predicted to go Screamie himself, that very day, by a fortune teller. Since she offered him a refund if she was wrong, Wellford looks forward to collecting. The briefing consists of a show where an apparent drugged Valorian confesses to seeking the conquest of Earth, and to bringing the Screamie disease as a biological weapon. Astonishingly, Weldon Radcliff executes the Valorian in front of his agents. To make matters worse, Wellford goes Screamie, as the fortune teller predicted.

Returning to Pennsylvania, Gregson confronts Helen, who admits to talking with the Valorian and being told that the Screamies were the advent of a new perception. By this time SecBu have begun a campaign to convince people that the Valorians are not only hostile but have powers of persuasion amounting to hypnosis. Helen recants her beliefs. Shortly afterward Gregson himself has his ultimate Screamie attack, and is sedated for removal to one of the many Isolation Institutes reserved for Screamers.

He endures months of psychic pain, apparent hallucinations, and terror, narrowly avoiding the typical fate of Screamers, who tend to commit suicide when their sedation wears off enough for them to reach a convenient high window. He recovers and is met by Helen on his release.

Now, like many ex-Screamers, Gregson is a valuable commodity to SecBu. Most elected officials are ex-Screamers, as are the top officials in the Bureau. Gregson learns that Wellford also recovered, only to be kidnapped by the Valorians. Radcliff reveals to him the existence of a device which can suppress the Screamies over a small area, by blocking the effects of an unknown form of radiation. Radcliff wants Gregson to help construct a super-suppressor on the space station Vega Jump-off, the departure point of the Nina, to cover the entire planet.

First, Gregson is sent to Paris for training. He learns that the Screamies really are a new form of perception, called zylphing and the radiation is called rault, created by a body at the galactic center known as Chandeen. Another body known as the Stygum Field blocks the rault, and Earth has been in the shadow for thousands of years.

Besides the training, Gregson is introduced to a temptress called Karen Rakar. Gaining proficiency at zylphing he learns that the perception can be used for many purposes, including telepathy, long-distance viewing, and even precognition. He also begins to realize the depth of the SecBu plot to keep and hold power. Discovering the head of the training institute asleep in a field of artificial rault he is able to zylph the man's true purposes from his mind. The man wakes up and Gregson has to kill him. He then escapes in a car, but as he does so he zylphs a re-entry capsule, bearing a Valorian, coming down nearby after having been disabled by SecBu weapons. Rescuing the occupant, a female, he drives to confront Madam Carnot, a conspirator who claims to be the oldest and most powerful zylpher on Earth. As he zylphs her true intentions, a rescue party led by Wellford breaks into the building, intent on rescuing the Valorian woman, but in the process capturing Gregson and killing Carnot. She had previously foretold a violent end for Gregson, but in reality she would be the victim.

In the Valorian hideout, a castle in the Rhine valley, Wellford assures Gregson that the Valorians have no powers beyond zylphing, nor any evil intent. Gregson is still doubtful. He sees the necessity to build the super-suppressor as the Screamies are getting worse by the day. His qualms at the intent of the SecBu conspirators are balanced by the urge to carry out the plan for the good of humanity.

The Valorian he rescued, who is called Andelia, tells him that his brother Manuel is alive, one of the few on the Nina who survived when the ship emerged into full rault. He cannot return to Earth because he has lost the ability to live without zylphing. Eventually, she promises Gregson, they will be re-united. Gregson, apparently free to leave the hideout, steals a craft and returns to Pennsylvania to find Helen, only to be captured by SecBu. They zylph the location of the castle from him, but by the time they get there only the injured Andelia is left for them to capture.

Gregson ships up to the space station for the final phase of construction. Crucial to the process is lowering the station's altitude, which is something only he can be counted on to do. On the station he re-unites with Karen Rakar. He is still ambivalent about which faction to side with. The station is already in a small suppressor field, but this breaks down long enough for him to detect the presence of Andelia. While he is talking to her a guard arrives and kills her. Gregson kills the guard, but is cut down yet again by Wellford, one of a boarding party intent on a last-ditch gamble.

Recovering, Gregson learns Wellford's plan. The super-suppressor can be re-wired to be a super-transmitter. All the top SecBu people are on the station, and activating a super-transmitter would fry the brains of everyone aboard. It is the supreme chance to decapitate the conspiracy, who plan to use their control over the super-suppressor to cement their power, threatening to turn it off if their demands are not met. With them eliminated, the super-suppressor could be activated as planned, and with help from the Valorians humanity would be able to recover the lost perception, ready to deal with high levels of rault which must be coming.

Gregson helps Wellford re-wire the suppressor, and they escape to a comparatively safe distance of a few thousand miles aboard Wellford's ship. Even at that distance, the radiance is almost more than they can bear. Returning to the station, they find the people aboard either dead or catatonic.

The final chapter takes place a few years later. Helen and Gregson are married with young children. Humanity is learning to live with rault, but already the Valorians have located another civilization about to emerge from the shadow of the Stygum Field. Gregson and Wellford are offered a place on that mission.

== Major themes ==
Above all the novel is a thriller in the style of Alistair MacLean. There are reflective moments during breaks in the action, where peripheral characters and events move, fleetingly, to center stage. There are vignettes of Valorians carrying out their duties, especially Andelia. The fear of infection engendered by the Screamies creates incidents which are visible to the main characters, but they do not participate or sympathize.

Mystical elements include the empathic bond between the Gregson brothers. Also, there are references to the Fall from the Garden of Eden as being one of many human legends caused by the Earth entering the shadow of the Stygum Field in ancient times, cutting off humanity from rault.

=== Technology ===
Most novels of the 1950s and 1960s tended to overestimate near-term progress in space and weapons technologies, while neglecting the rise of computer technology. In this version of the 1990s, characters wield laser weapons, which can kill or stun depending on how focussed the beam is. In the opening sequence the attack on Gregson's flying craft involves both lasers and .50 caliber machine guns, which elicits the comment "Something old, something new" from Wellford.

The flying craft themselves, some described as "hoppers", have VTOL capabilities and unusually long ranges. They are also quite quiet, so that Gregson is taken by surprise when hoppers descend around him while he is searching for Helen in Pennsylvania.

The ability to travel into space is available to clandestine groups, suggesting great advances in propulsion over basic chemical rockets which require tons of fuel to place even modest payloads into orbit. The Nina apparently also makes use of previously unknown propulsion systems, possibly the ion drives used in other contemporary novels, which allow acceleration to very high speeds if left running for long enough.

== Characters in A Scourge of Screamers ==
- Arthur Gregson is a spaceflight engineer who helped build the Vega Jump-off station. His twin brother Manuel is an astronaut aboard the starship Nina. They have something of an empathic link, so that Gregson is dimly aware that his brother encountered something inexplicable on the Nina's first voyage. Gregson is one of the first people to believe that aliens have something to do with what happened to the Nina, but is not believed until the Valorians begin appearing on Earth. The nature of Gregson's character in the novel is somewhat passive. He is more of a witness to events than a creator of them. His role is to try to understand the puzzle, but not necessarily to solve it. His virtues are faithfulness and fortitude, like John Bunyan's character Christian in The Pilgrim's Progress.
- Kenneth Wellford is Gregson's fellow engineer and close friend. Both were recruited by SecBu for its own reasons, probably having to do with the super-suppressor project. SecBu stole the technology from the first Valorians who made contact with Earth authorities, long before they revealed it to Gregson. Wellford displays the stereotypical English tendency to understate things: "Unmitigated Hell, wasn't it?" is his comment on the effects of the rault burst they used to kill the SecBu conspiracy. Wellford is a more active participant in the plot, becoming a collaborator with the Valorians in their efforts to help Earth. In fact, since the Valorians are not interested in reforming Earth government, it is arguable that humans like Wellford are the main driving force behind the rebel movement.
- Helen Forsythe, Gregson's fiancée, lives with her blind father on a farm in Pennsylvania. Her father has overcome his disability in ingenious ways. Obviously he has much to gain from zylphing, which is one of the reasons Helen is willing to believe the Valorians. After both Helen and her father disappear, Gregson believes they are held hostage by SecBu to ensure his cooperation. In fact they were taken to safety by rebels and both were taught to zylph. The essence of the perception is that there can be no secrets between people, but that is balanced by total understanding of others. When Helen zylphs the affair between Gregson and Karen Rakar, she dismisses it because she sees the underlying reasons, along with Gregson's deep commitment to her.
- Weldon Radcliff, the Director of SecBu, is a squat, muscular man, powerful in all senses of the word. As a former Screamer, he is able to use zylphing to manipulate the people around him. However he is ruthless and cruel. Andelia's death is ordered by him simply because she is "excess baggage". It is this which finally turns Gregson against SecBu.
- The Valorians originate from a planet closer to Chandeen, and have been using zylphing for millennia. Although humanoid, they are anatomically distinct even to a casual observer, but unlikely to arouse suspicion, especially in large cities where odd people are often seen on a daily basis. They are easily recognized by anyone familiar with them, thanks to distinctive facial characteristics which cannot be disguised. Using wigs and false fingernails is their main method of avoiding discovery. Valorian technology is advanced compared to Earth, but they are somewhat naive and fall prey to the conspiracy when they first make contact and offer to help. Their technology includes raultronics, which they use to build rault-suppressors and rault-casters. The casters are their equivalent of a flashlight, allowing them to use their perceptions where rault is absent, a condition they call stygumness. SecBu steals this technology from the early emissaries. The Valorians do not wish to remove the existing Earth government, merely to help the people of Earth emerge from stygumness. Without human involvement in the rebellion, they would probably allow SecBu to carry out its plans.
- Madame Carnot is the oldest and most skilled zylpher among humans. She is, to all intents and purposes, the Queen of the conspirators, as well as being their soothsayer. Her abilities extend to foreseeing a violent future event, but she mistakenly sees it as killing Gregson, when in fact he is present when the rebel raid kills her.
