= Marco Weber (film producer) =

German-American film producer and entrepreneur (born 1966)

Marco Weber (born 1966, Leer, East Frisia) is a Los Angeles-based German film producer and entrepreneur. He is best known for The Thirteenth Floor and Unthinkable.

== Biography ==
=== Early career ===
Weber entered the entertainment industry as a production manager for the German version of The Price Is Right, before moving into TV commercial production.

In 1992, he relocated to Los Angeles with the goal of producing and financing independent movies. His first film production credit was on the documentary Annie’s Shooting, about the photographer Annie Leibovitz. In 1994, he released his first feature film, Don't Do It, with a then-unknown Heather Graham.

=== Atlantic Streamline ===
In 1998, Weber founded Atlantic Streamline, a production company then aligned with Roland Emmerich's Centropolis Entertainment, with the goal of releasing low to mid-budget films. Together, Weber and Emmerich produced the sci-fi thriller The Thirteenth Floor directed by Josef Rusnak and starring Vincent D'Onofrio and Armin Mueller-Stahl.

Emmerich parted from the company after The Thirteenth Floor; Weber continued on until the flop of All the Queen's Men in 2002 put the company in financial trouble, jeopardizing its next project, the black comedy Igby Goes Down. To secure a cast, Weber opened a faux production office; with the cast in place, he was able to secure funding.

The film was a success, earning Golden Globe nominations for its actors Kieran Culkin and Susan Sarandon. Writer-director Burr Steers was honored with an Independent Spirit Award nomination for best screenplay. Soon after, Weber closed a first look/cofinancing deal with MGM/UA.

In 2005, he began production of the film Grimm Love, inspired by the case of convicted cannibalistic murderer Armin Meiwes, leading to a legal challenge by Meiwes, who alleged the film violated his personal rights. On March 3, 2006, a week before its German debut, the German courts blocked the theatrical release of the film. The ban was overturned three years later by the German Federal Court.

Outside of its legal controversy, the film was well received; at Sitges Film Festival and Bucheon International Fantastic Film Festival, Grimm Love received awards for best director (Martin Weisz) and best leading actors (Thomas Kretschmann, Thomas Huber), among others.

=== Senator Entertainment ===
In late 2005, Weber and German media lawyer Helge Sasse acquired a majority stake in the long-established but insolvent German distribution company, Senator Entertainment. In June 2006, Senator established a Los Angeles office, headed by Weber, absorbing Atlantic Streamline.

After restructuring under Weber and Sasse, the company doubled its revenue in 2006 and managed to break even early 2007. By the end of 2007, Senator had nearly doubled the results of the previous year with a turnover of €68.37 million. 2007 releases included the Academy Award-nominated Pan's Labyrinth, 1408, and Quentin Tarantino's Death Proof. With the experimental sub-label Autobahn, Weber aimed to distribute "smaller, edgier" genre films – a strategy that worked for low-budget movies like Hard Candy starring Elliot Page.

As managing director of the American daughter company Senator Entertainment Inc., USA, he produced two high-profile independent movies – the family drama Fireflies in the Garden starring Julia Roberts, Willem Dafoe and Ryan Reynolds, as well as the Bret Easton Ellis adaptation The Informers with Mickey Rourke, Kim Basinger and Winona Ryder – both of which were sold worldwide.

In the German market, Senator struggled in 2008 – even critically acclaimed productions like The Orphanage proved a box-office disappointment. It was only in spring 2009 that Weber's acquisition The Reader, starring Kate Winslet, provided the distributor with another blockbuster. It was the company's most successful movie since 2003.

In September 2008, Weber stepped down from his role with Senator Entertainment AG, acquiring all the shares for Senator Entertainment, Inc., the LA-based arm of the business, with the goal of focusing on the production of English-language films and becoming a distributor. Weber continued to collaborate with the Sasse-headed Senator, releasing the thriller Unthinkable, starring Samuel L. Jackson, in 2010.

=== Pivot to technology ===
In 2014, Weber signed a deal with BitTorrent to launch "BitTorrent Originals" as part of BitTorrent Bundle, a platform launched the previous year for creators to release free or paid content. It was reported that the BitTorrent Bundle team would relocate to LA and embed itself with Weber's production company, Rapid Eye Studios.

The first product of this partnership, Children of the Machine, was announced in July 2014, with Weber credited as co-creating and writing with Jeff Stockwell, and Rapid Eye Studios financing the project. Additional funding would come through sponsorships with the help of ad agency Addressomo. The series would extend into a video game.

As first pitched, viewers could crowdfund the series if the pilot reached a threshold of 250,000 subscribers pre-paying for the content. This approach was changed the following year—the series would instead be free to download, and fans could buy an upgraded version of the content for $9.95. Filming began in January 2015 in Lancaster, California; the series was planned to release in December 2015.

Weber continued his transition into tech entrepreneurship in 2016, when he founded VRenetic, a VR company, with previous collaborator Roland Emmerich. The two had first worked together in 1999 while producing The Thirteenth Floor, which dealt with the technology thematically. Their goal was to make VR accessible, beyond those who could afford headsets.

VRenetic's primary product, Vresh, was a mobile app for 360-degree video streaming, which launched in January 2019. In January 2020 VRenetic announced a partnership with the Beijing Culture Fund to distribute the app in China; the company announced it would move its leadership operations to China, including Weber, who planned to relocate for two years.

The company's website was abandoned in 2023.

In 2023, Weber and Emmerich debuted a new project with game developers Jerome Wu and Tony Tang, with the aim of establishing a transmedia franchise centered around the cryptocurrency-based MMPORG Space Nation Online. The game soft launched the following year; soon after, Weber and Emmerich announced plans for a live-action TV series depicting the origins of the game's story.

== Personal ==
Weber was previously married to Anne Caroline and had four children with her; they separated in June 2024.

== Filmography ==
Selected filmography as producer (unless otherwise stated)

- 1994: Don't Do It (Executive Producer)
- 1995: Red Meat
- 1997: No Strings Attached
- 1999: The Thirteenth Floor
- 1999: You're Dead
- 2001: All the Queen's Men
- 2002: Igby Goes Down
- 2005: Rohtenburg (aka Grimm Love)
- 2007: Fireflies in the Garden
- 2008: The Informers
- 2009: Unthinkable
- 2010: Brooklyn's Finest
