= Simulationism =

Simulationism can refer to:

- The simulation hypothesis, hypothesis that reality could be a computer simulation
- The Neo-Geo or Post-Conceptualism, an art movement that refers to technology replacing nature in art
- The imitation of characteristics of a certain genre of role-playing game
