= Grimm Love =

Rohtenburg
- Promotional poster for the U.S. release of Rohtenburg
- Directed by: Martin Weisz
- Written by: T.S. Faull
- Produced by: Marco Weber; Vanessa Coifman; Andreas Schmid
- Starring: Keri Russell; Thomas Kretschmann; Thomas Huber
- Cinematography: Jonathan Sela
- Edited by: Sue Blainey
- Music by: Steven Gutheinz
- Release dates: August 27, 2006 (London FrightFest Film Festival); June 18, 2009 (Germany)
- Running time: 87 minutes
- Country: Germany
- Language: English

Grimm Love (original German title Rohtenburg, a pun on roh "raw" and Rotenburg) is a 2006 psychological horror film inspired by the Armin Meiwes cannibal murder case.

== Plot ==
Keri Russell plays Katie Armstrong, an American student in Germany studying criminal psychology. She chooses a notorious subject for her thesis: the cannibal killer Oliver Hartwin (played by Thomas Kretschmann). Oliver dreamed of eating a willing victim and, thanks to the internet, he was able to find a volunteer, a young man named Simon Grombeck (played by Thomas Huber).

The story is told in flashbacks as Katie researches these men and their pasts. Events culminate in Katie's discovery of a snuff tape that documents the crime.

== Cast ==
- Keri Russell as Katie Armstrong
- Thomas Kretschmann as Oliver Hartwin
- Thomas Huber as Simon Grombeck
- Rainier Meissner as Young Oliver
- Angelika Bartsch as Viktoria
- Alexander Martschewski as Rudy
- Nils Dommning as Karl
- Marcus Lucas as Felix
- Pascal Andres as Young Simon
- Helga Bellinghausen as Simon's Mom
- Tatjana Clasing as Hanna
- Stefan Gebelhoff as Simon's Dad
- Jonas Gruber as Rainer
- Nikolai Kinski as Otto Hauser
- Renate Naujoks as House Wife
- Valerie Niehaus as Margit
- Jörg Reimers as Oliver's Dad
- Sybille J. Schedwill as Frau Schinder
- Pierre Shrady as The principal
- Axel Wedekind as Domino

== Production ==
The film is directed by music-video specialist Martin Weisz and written by T. S. Faull.

== Release ==
The film had its world premiere at London FrightFest Film Festival on 27 August 2006 under the title Grimm Love.

In October 2006, the film won four awards at the Festival de Cine de Sitges: Best Director, Best Actor (Thomas Kretschmann and Thomas Huber), and Best Cinematography. It won the Melies d'Argent at the Luxembourg International Film Festival. In July 2007, the film won Best Director and Best Actor (Thomas Kretschman and Thomas Huber) at the Puchon International Fantastic Film Festival.

Rohtenburg was scheduled for release in Germany on 9 March 2006. In March 2006, the film was banned by a German court for infringing the personal rights of Armin Meiwes, but the film had already been sold for international release and was shown worldwide. In May 2009, the Federal Court of Justice annulled the ban in favor of freedom of arts.

The film was also screened at Austin's South by Southwest festival, among others, in advance of its US release.
