= You're Dead (film) =

- DVD box
- Directed by: Andy Hurst
- Written by: Andy Hurst
- Produced by: Marco Weber
- Starring: Rhys Ifans; John Hurt
- Cinematography: Wedigo von Schultzendorff
- Edited by: Andrew Starke
- Music by: Robert Folk
- Distributed by: Entertainment Film Distributors (United Kingdom); Concorde Filmverleih (Germany)
- Release date: 1999
- Running time: 98 minutes
- Countries: United Kingdom; Germany
- Language: English

You're Dead is a 1999 British dark comedy crime film directed by Andy Hurst. Although set in London most of the film was in fact filmed in Germany, and the film was released in German dub as You Are Dead, and in Japan as King of UK. The plot concerns a disastrously fatal bank robbery set up by a gangster's son played by Rhys Ifans, while the emotional centre of the film is built on the relationship between the accomplice in the robbery, a veteran safe-breaker played by John Hurt, and his policewoman daughter.
