= Squatters (film) =

- Directed by: Martin Weisz
- Written by: Justin Shilton
- Produced by: Cordula Betz; Todd Moyer; Julius R. Nasso; Martin Weisz
- Starring: Gabriella Wilde; Thomas Dekker; Richard Dreyfuss; Luke Grimes
- Cinematography: Harold Skinner
- Edited by: Carsten Kurpanek
- Music by: Mario Grigorov
- Distributed by: Sony Pictures Home Entertainment
- Release date: May 13, 2014
- Running time: 102 minutes
- Country: United States
- Language: English

Squatters is a 2014 American direct-to-video independent drama film directed by Martin Weisz and starring Gabriella Wilde, Thomas Dekker, Richard Dreyfuss, and Luke Grimes. Film reviews were generally mixed to negative.

== Premise ==
Two runway adults, Jonas and Kelly, live homeless in Venice Beach and begin squatting in a mansion in the Pacific Palisades when Jonas overhears Evelyn revealing door access codes to a nanny before leaving on vacation. They take advantage of the situation, trying to sell items to British gangster Ronald but have to bolt when the homeowners return from vacation early. Kelly begins a relationship with the unsuspecting couple's son, Michael, who she meets by chance in an Americana theater that screens looping Charlie Chaplin films. Michael and his parents are guilt stricken over the loss of the daughter, Stephanie who died from a drug overdose, and they allow Kelly into the house, fostering the relationship oblivious that she's the original intruder. Ronald threatens Jonas' life over failure to deliver a promised vehicle so he visits the house, confronts Michael's father for the keys and takes Kelly away to Ronald's house, where Kelly calls the police clandestinely. When police arrive, they engage Ronald and an accomplice in a firefight; both are fatally shot, but not before Ronald brutally beats Kelly, who then later goes to jail and Michael later welcomes her back.

== Cast ==
- Gabriella Wilde as Kelly
- Thomas Dekker as Jonas
- Richard Dreyfuss as David
- Lolita Davidovich as Evelyn
- Luke Grimes as Michael
- Gia Mantegna as Stephanie
- Andrew Howard as Ronald
- Evan Ross as AJ
- Nancy Travis as Carol

== Score ==
Songs used in film but not included in the soundtrack:

1. Quiet Corral – "Shadows"
2. Paul Wolinski – "Like Fireflies"
3. Patrick Krief – "Perfect Bodies"
4. Vancouver Sleep Clinic – "Vapour"
5. Mario Grigorov – "Jazzy Marcus"
6. Crypts – "Territories"
7. Le Butcherettes – "New York"
8. Pondus – "Too Dark"
9. Angela Ricci – "Here to Stay"
10. The Antlers – "Kettering"
11. The Unwinding Hours – "Knut"
12. The Kissaway Trail – "New Lipstick"

== Reception ==
On the review aggregator website Rotten Tomatoes, 52% of audience reviews are positive with an average score of 5.7/10, with the site consensus of; "interesting, starts out promising and then morphs into an awful morality lesson, with anyone's inner romantic having departed halfway through".
