= T. A. Hasler House =

Historic house in Texas, United States

- U.S. National Register of Historic Places
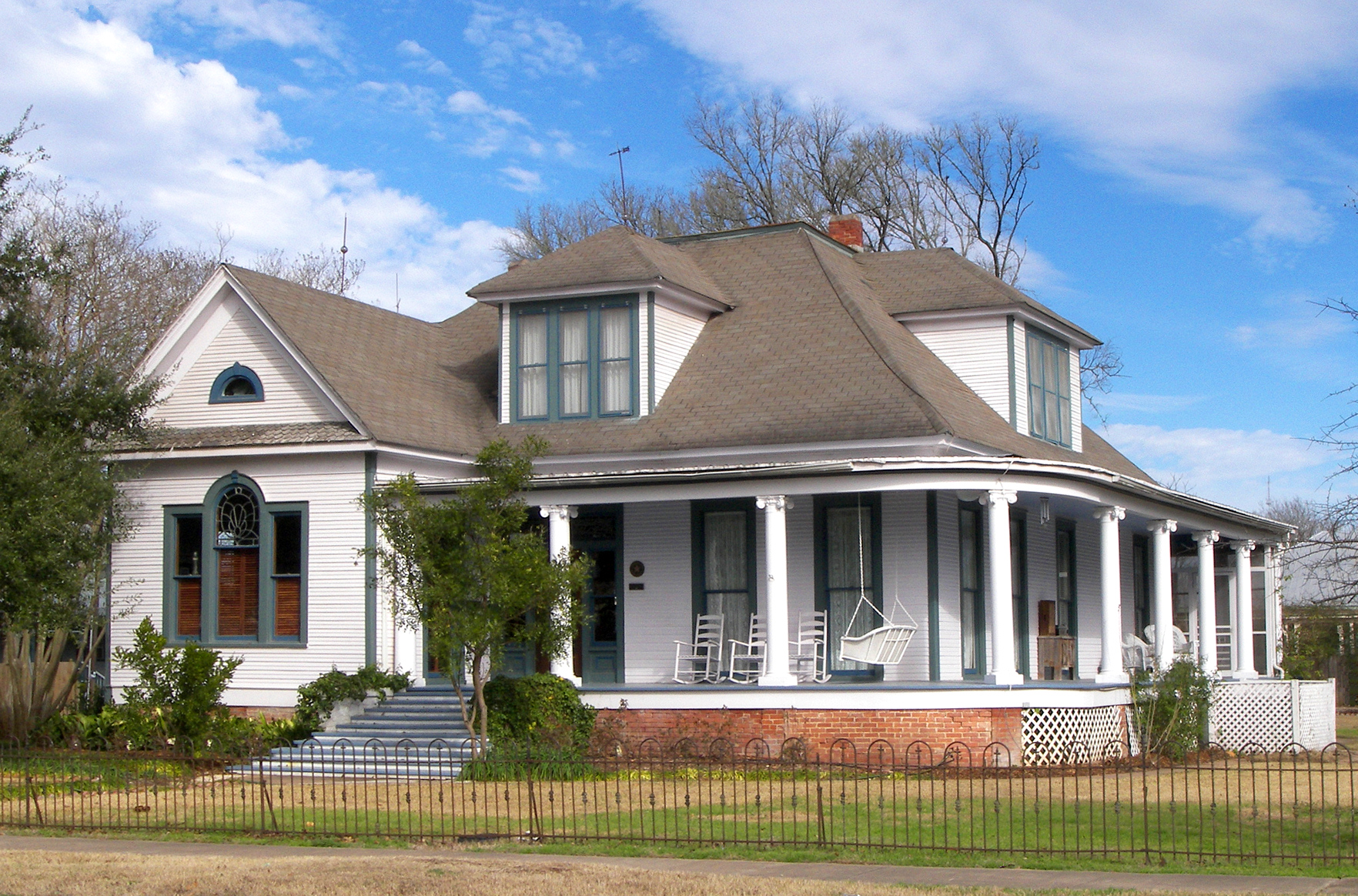
- T. A. Hasler House in 2008

- Location within Texas Location within the United States
- Location: 1109 Pecan St., Bastrop, Texas
- Coordinates: 30°6′45″N 97°19′2″W
- Area: less than one acre
- Built: 1905
- Architectural style: Classical Revival
- MPS: Bastrop Historic and Architectural MRA
- NRHP reference No.: 78003330
- Added to NRHP: December 22, 1978

The T. A. Hasler House is a Classical Revival-style house located in Bastrop, Texas. The two-story house was renovated from a farm house-style dwelling by Marie Hasler, after the death of her husband T. A. Hasler. The structure was listed in the National Register of Historic Places on December 22, 1978. The home was featured in a Glidden (paints) commercial ("Father & Son" 1991) and in the film Fireflies in the Garden (2008) starring Julia Roberts and Ryan Reynolds.

When Marie Hasler rebuilt the house, she used the finest materials, including leaded windows from Switzerland, longleaf pine wainscoting, and a tiger (or quarter-sawn) oak fireplace. The house featured two parlors, a wide central hallway, and broad wrap-around front porch.

== See also ==
- National Register of Historic Places listings in Bastrop County, Texas
