= Daniel F. Galouye =

American science fiction writer

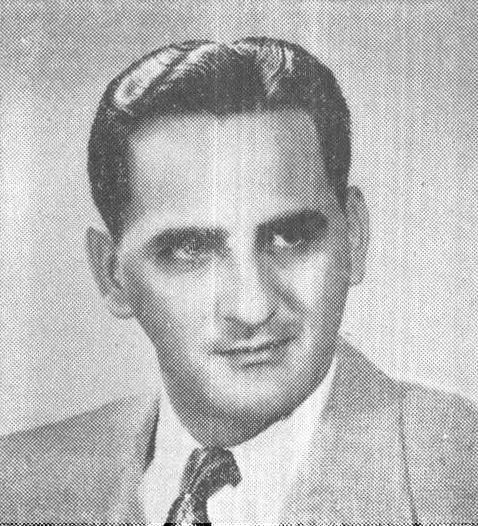
- Daniel F. Galouye c. 1952
- Born: Daniel Francis Galouye; 11 February 1920; New Orleans, Louisiana
- Died: 7 September 1976 (aged 56); New Orleans, Louisiana
- Education: Louisiana State University
- Occupation: Writer
- Spouse: Carmel Barbara Jordan
- Writing career
- Pen name: Louis G. Daniels
- Notable works: Dark Universe; Lords of the Psychon; Simulacron-3; A Scourge of Screamers

Daniel Francis Galouye (11 February 1920 – 7 September 1976) was an American science fiction writer. During the 1950s and 1960s, he contributed novelettes and short stories to various digest size science fiction magazines, sometimes writing under the pseudonym Louis G. Daniels.

Born in New Orleans, Galouye (pronounced Gah-lou-ey) graduated from Louisiana State University (B.A.) and then worked as a reporter for several newspapers. During World War II, he served in the US Navy as an instructor and test pilot, receiving injuries that led to later health problems. On December 26, 1945, he married Carmel Barbara Jordan. From the 1940s until his retirement in 1967, he was on the staff of The States-Item. He lived in New Orleans but also had a summer home across Lake Pontchartrain at St. Tammany Parish in Covington, Louisiana.

Richard Dawkins professes to be a fan of his works, including Counterfeit World, which inspired him to think about the concept of simulated universes.

== Novels and stories ==
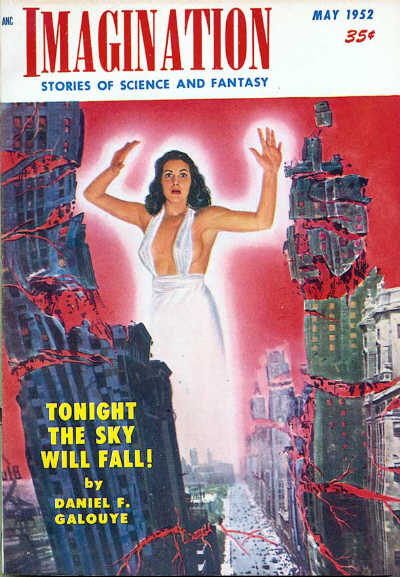
Galouye's novella "Tonight the Sky Will Fall!" was the cover story for the May 1952 issue of Imagination

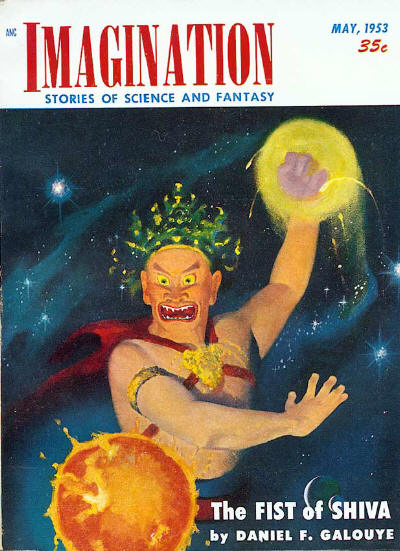
Galouye's novella "The Fist of Shiva" took the cover of the May 1953 issue of Imagination

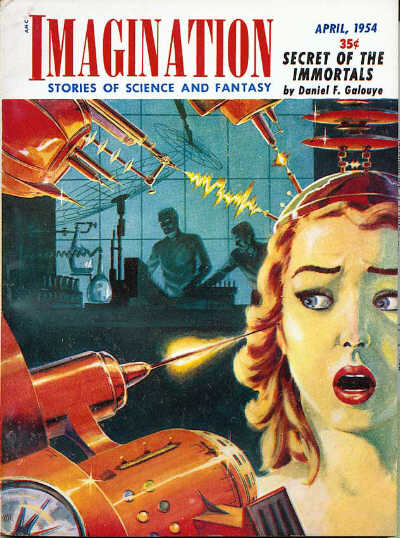
Galouye's novella "Secret of the Immortals" was the cover story for the April 1954 issue of Imagination

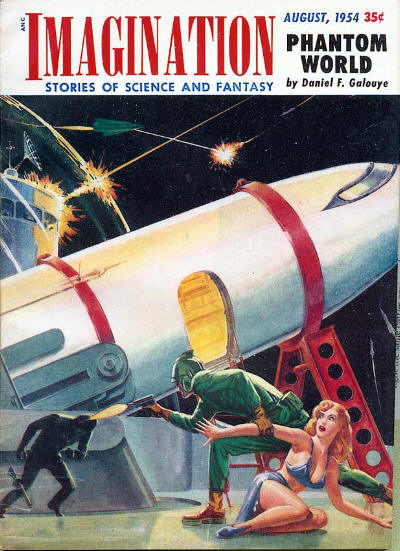
Galouye's novella "Phantom World" was cover-featured on the August 1954 issue of Imagination

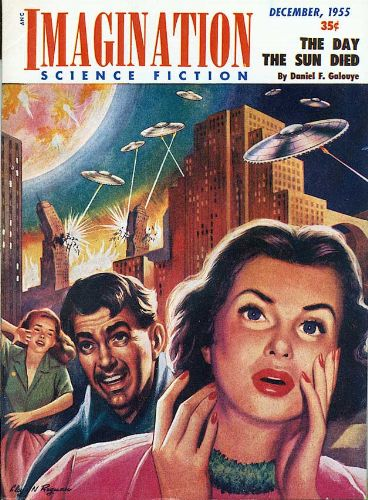
Galouye's novella "The Day the Sun Died" was the cover story for the December 1955 issue of Imagination

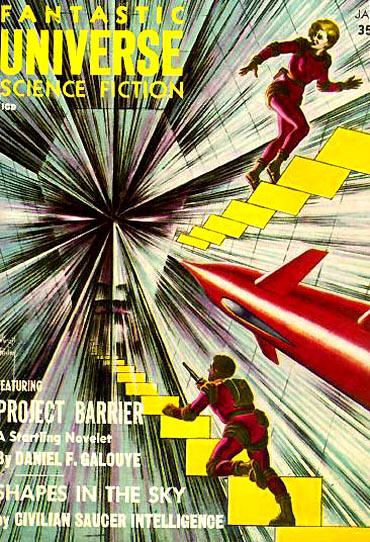
Galouye's novelette "Project Barrier" was the cover story for the January 1958 issue of Fantastic Universe

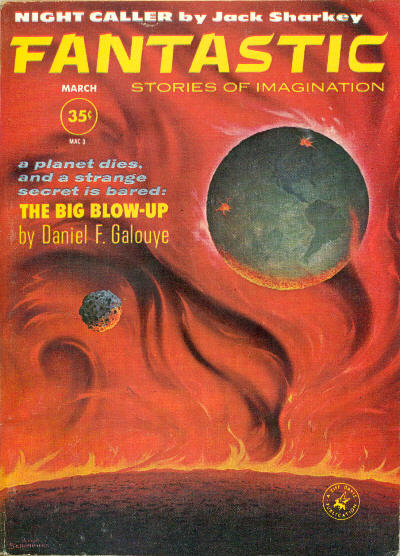
Galouye's novelette "The Big Blow-Up" was cover-featured on the March 1961 issue of Fantastic

Galouye's first published fiction, the novelette Rebirth, appeared in the March 1952 issue of Imagination. His work appeared in many magazines during this era including Galaxy Science Fiction and The Magazine of Fantasy & Science Fiction. Between 1961 and 1973, Galouye wrote five novels, notably Simulacron Three, basis of the movie The Thirteenth Floor (1999) and the German TV miniseries World on a Wire (1973) (directed by Rainer Werner Fassbinder). His first novel, Dark Universe (1961) was nominated for a Hugo.

According to his obituary in the New Orleans States-Item, Galouye...

... was a Navy pilot during WWII from 1942 to 1946. He graduated from Pensacola Naval Air School, held the rank of lieutenant and was for a time during his service years in charge of a training school in Hawaii for Navy airmen. Immediately after release from the Navy, he began his career with The States-Item as a reporter, then as a copy editor and joined the editorial department in 1956. He later was named associate editor of that department, retiring in 1967. He is survived by his widow, Mrs. Carmel Barbara Jordan Galouye; two daughters, Mrs. Gerald Johan Zomerdijk of Zaandam, the Netherlands, and Mrs. Joseph Edward Ingraham of Covington; and five grandchildren.

His retirement was due to failing health, which was in turn related to injuries sustained during his Navy service. His health continued to decline until his early death at age 56. He died in New Orleans' Veteran's Hospital and is interred at Covington Cemetery #1 in Covington.

== Awards ==
In 2007, Galouye was the recipient of the Cordwainer Smith Rediscovery Award, which is co-sponsored by the heirs of Paul Linebarger (who wrote as Cordwainer Smith) and Readercon. The jury for this award recognizes a deceased genre writer whose work should be "rediscovered" by the readers of today, and that newly rediscovered writer is a deceased guest of honor at the following year's Readercon. Galouye was named 6 July 2007 by Barry N. Malzberg and Gordon Van Gelder, speaking on behalf of themselves and the other two judges, Martin H. Greenberg and Mike Resnick.

== Bibliography ==
=== Novels ===
- Dark Universe (1961), greatly expanded and substantially rewritten from "Rebirth" (Imagination, March 1952)
- Lords of the Psychon (1963), expanded and much revised from "The City of Force" (Galaxy, April 1959)
- Simulacron-3 (1964), UK title Counterfeit World
- A Scourge of Screamers (1968), UK title The Lost Perception
- The Infinite Man (1973) fix-up from the two "Tarl Brent" stories: "Tonight the Sky Will Fall!" (Imagination, May 1952) and "The Day the Sun Died" (Imagination, December 1955)

=== Collections ===
- The Last Leap and Other Stories of the Supermind (1964)
  - Sanctuary (novelette) in F&SF (Feb 1954)
  - "Jebaburba" in Galaxy (Oct 1954)
  - Deadline Sunday (novellette) in Imagination (Oct 1955)
  - "Seeing-Eye Dog" in Galaxy (Sep 1956)
  - The Last Leap (novelette) in IF (Jan 60)
  - "Kangaroo Court" in IF (Sep 1960)
  - Fighting Spirit (novelette) in Galaxy (Dec 1960)
  - "Homey Atmosphere" in Galaxy (Apr 1961)
- Die stummen Schwingen (1967) [Pabel {German}, "Utopia Zukunft" series #313] translated by Nikolai Stockhammer [copyright page asserts that it is a translation of the collection named "Mindmate and other stories"]
  - "Stoßtrupp" (aka "Shock Troop" 1957 )
  - "Der Persönlichkeitstausch" (aka Mindmate 1964 )
  - "Die stummen Schwingen" (aka A Silence of Wings 1962 )
  - "Welt der Diebe" (aka "If Money" 1957 )
  - "Außenseiter" (aka Soft Touch 1959 )
- Project Barrier (1968)
  - "Shuffle Board" in IF (Jun 1957)
  - "Project Barrier" in Fantastic Universe (Jan 1958)
  - "Recovery Area" in Amazing (Feb 1963)
  - Reign of the Telepuppets (novella) in Amazing (Aug 1963)
  - "Rub-a-Dub" in Fantastic (Apr 1961) as "Descent into the Maelstrom"
- This Crowded Earth AND Reign of the Telepuppets ({Jan} 2012) - This Crowded Earth is by Robert Bloch. Armchair Fiction Double Novel #42.

=== Short fiction ===
- "Rebirth" in Imagination (Mar 1952)
- "Tonight the Sky Will Fall!" in Imagination (May 1952); also see The Infinite Man (1973), the editorial in the March 1952 issue of Imagination cites this as the first Galouye story accepted for publication.
- "The Reluctant Hero" in Imagination (Jul 1952)
- "The Dangerous Doll" in Imagination (Sep 1952)
- "The Levitant" in Imagination (Dec 1952)
- "Spillthrough" in Imagination (Jan 1953)
- "Second Wind" in Imagination (Apr 1953)
- "..Do Us Part" in Imagination (Apr 1953), as by Louis G. Daniels
- "The Fist of Shiva" in Imagination (May 1953)
- "Effie" in Imagination (Jun 1953)
- "So Says the Master" in Imagination (Oct 1953)
- "Blessed Are the Meekbots" in Imagination (Dec 1953)
- "Sanctuary" (novelette) in F&SF (Feb 1954), collected in The Last Leap and Other Stories of the Supermind (1964)
- "Disposal Unit" in Imagination (Mar 1954)
- "Secret of the Immortals" in Imagination (Apr 1954)
- "Cosmic Santa Claus" in Imagination (May 1954)
- "... The World is But a Stage" in Imagination (Jun 1954)
- "Phantom World" in Imagination (Aug 1954)
- "Supermen Need Superwives!" in Imagination (Aug 1954), as by Louis G. Daniels
- "Immortality, Inc." in Imagination (Sep 1954)
- "Satan's Shrine" in Galaxy (Sep 1954)
- "Jebaburba" in Galaxy (Oct 1954), collected in The Last Leap and Other Stories of the Supermind (1964)
- "The Man with Two Lives" in Imaginative Tales (Mar 1955)
- "Over the River" in Imaginative Tales (May 1955)
- "...So Very Dark" in Imaginative Tales (Jul 1955)
- "Country Estate" in Galaxy (Aug 1955)
- "Deadline Sunday" (novelette) in Imagination (Oct 1955), collected in The Last Leap and Other Stories of the Supermind (1964)
- "The Day the Sun Died" (Imagination, Dec 1955); also see The Infinite Man (1973)
- "The Pliable" in F&SF (May 1956)
- "Seeing-Eye Dog" in Galaxy (Sep 1956), collected in The Last Leap and Other Stories of the Supermind (1964)
- "All Jackson's Children" in Galaxy (Jan 1957)
- "Gulliver Planet" in Science Fiction Adventures (Apr 1957)
- "Shock Troop" in Galaxy (Jun 1957)
- "Shuffle Board" in IF (Jun 1957), collected in Project Barrier (1968)
- "If Money" in Galaxy (Aug 1957)
- "The Destiny Detector" in Amazing Stories (Sep 1957)
- "Share Alike" in Galaxy (Oct 1957)
- "The Childless Ones" in Super Science-Fiction (Oct 1957)
- "Project Barrier" in Fantastic Universe (Jan 1958), collected in Project Barrier (1968)
- "Hostile Life-Form" in Super-Science Fiction (Jun 1958), as by Daniel L. Galouye
- Trade Mission" in Fantastic Universe (Jan 1959)
- "Beware The Robot" in Super-Science Fiction (Feb 1959), as by Daniel L. Galouye
- "The City of Force" in Galaxy (Apr 1959), much revised and expanded as Lords of the Psychon, 1963
- "Soft Touch" in Galaxy (Jun 1959)
- "Sitting Duck" in IF (Jul 1959)
- "Minor Offense" in Fantastic Universe (Nov 1959)
- "Diplomatic Coop" in Star Science Fiction Stories#5 (Pohl) (1959), reprinted with alternate ending, 1970
- "The Last Leap" (novelette) in IF (Jan 60), collected in The Last Leap and Other Stories of the Supermind (1964)
- "Gravy Train" in IF (Mar 60)
- "Kangaroo Court" in IF (Sep 1960), collected in The Last Leap and Other Stories of the Supermind (1964)
- "Fighting Spirit" (novelette) in Galaxy (Dec 1960), collected in The Last Leap and Other Stories of the Supermind (1964)
- "Summons of the Void" in Fantastic (Dec 1960) [rp in Thrilling Science Fiction (Aug 1973)]
- "The Reality Paradox" in Fantastic (Jan 1961)
- "The Chasers" in Galaxy (Feb 1961)
- "The Big Blow-Up" in Fantastic (Mar 1961)
- "Descent into the Maelstrom" in Fantastic (Apr 1961), collected in Project Barrier as "Rub-a-Dub" (1968)
- "Homey Atmosphere" in Galaxy (Apr 1961), collected in The Last Leap and Other Stories of the Supermind (1964)
- "The Trekkers" in Fantastic (Sep 1961)
- "Mirror Image" in IF (Sep 1961)
- "Spawn of Doom" in Fantastic (Dec 1961)
- "A Silence of Wings" in Fantastic (Feb 1962)
- "Recovery Area" in Amazing (Feb 1963), collected in Project Barrier (1968)
- "Reign of the Telepuppets" (novella) in Amazing (Aug 1963), collected in Project Barrier (1968)
- "Centipedes of Space" in Fantastic (Apr 1964)
- "Mindmate" in Amazing (Jul 1964)
- "Flight of Fancy" in F&SF (Apr 1968)
- "O Kind Master" in IF (Jan 1970)
- "Diplomatic Coop (w. alternate ending) in SF: Authors' Choice 2 ([Harry Harrison], {May} 1970)
- "Prometheus Rebound" in The Year 2000 ([Harry Harrison], 1970)
