= World on a Wire =

1973 West German TV series

- Press info ("Presseheft") front cover
- Based on: Simulacron-3 by Daniel F. Galouye
- Screenplay by: Fritz Müller-Scherz; Rainer Werner Fassbinder
- Directed by: Rainer Werner Fassbinder
- Starring: Klaus Löwitsch; Barbara Valentin; Mascha Rabben; Karl-Heinz Vosgerau; Wolfgang Schenck; Günter Lamprecht; Ulli Lommel
- Music by: Gottfried Hüngsberg
- Country of origin: West Germany
- Original language: German

Production
- Producers: Peter Märthesheimer; Alexander Wesemann
- Cinematography: Michael Ballhaus; Ulrich Prinz
- Editors: Ursula Elles; Marie Anne Gerhardt
- Running time: 206 minutes (I: 100 / II: 106)

Original release
- Network: ARD
- Release: 14 October – 16 October 1973

World on a Wire (German: Welt am Draht) is a 1973 West German science fiction television serial, starring Klaus Löwitsch and directed by Rainer Werner Fassbinder. Shot in 16 mm, it was made for West German television and originally aired in 1973 in ARD as a two-part miniseries. It was based on the 1964 novel Simulacron-3 by Daniel F. Galouye. An adaptation of the Fassbinder version was presented as the play World of Wires, directed by Jay Scheib, in 2012.

Its focus is not on action, but on sophistic and philosophic aspects of the human mind, simulation, and the role of scientific research. A movie based on the same novel titled The Thirteenth Floor starring Craig Bierko was released in 1999.

== Plot ==
In the present day, the Institute for Cybernetics and Futurology's (Institut für Kybernetik und Zukunftsforschung) new supercomputer hosts a simulation program that includes an artificial world with more than 9,000 "identity units" who live as human beings, unaware that their world is just a simulation. Professor Vollmer (Adrian Hoven), who is the technical director of the program, is apparently on the verge of an incredible secret discovery. He becomes increasingly agitated and anti-social before dying in a mysterious accident. His successor, Dr. Fred Stiller, has a discussion with Günther Lause, the security adviser of the institute when the latter suddenly disappears without a trace before he is able to pass on Vollmer's secret to Stiller. More mysterious still is the fact that none of the other IKZ employees seem to have any memory of Lause.

Meanwhile, one of the identity units in the simulation attempts suicide. This unit is deleted by Stiller's colleague Walfang to keep the simulation stable. To investigate the reasons for the suicide, Stiller enters into the simulated world to interview the contact unit. The unit, called Einstein, is the only identity unit that knows the "world" is a simulation, and this is necessary to run the program. In an attempt to become a real person, Einstein switches his mind into Walfang's body while Stiller is in contact with the simulated world. Einstein gives Stiller an explanation for the mysteries, vanishing memories, and vanishing persons, telling him that Stiller's "real world" is nothing but a simulation of the real world, which is one level above.

This knowledge causes Stiller to slip into insanity. The other "real" people interrogate Stiller and he is threatened with death, incarceration, and involuntary commitment. Stiller is finally able to convince Hahn, the IKZ psychologist, of his theory. The latter soon dies in an accident that is pinned on Stiller, marking him as the suspected murderer of both Hahn and Vollmer.

Stiller flees and searches for the necessary contact unit who can connect his "real" world with the real world, a level above. He survives several assassination attempts and discovers the contact is Eva, who was projected into the simulation after Vollmer's death (as his non-existent daughter). Stiller accepts her presence, believing they once had a romance. Eva tells him he was modeled on the real Fred Stiller, a person whom Eva loved, but who went mad with power from directing the simulation in the world above. While Stiller is programmed to die in an ambush, Eva switches the minds of the two Stillers and brings the simulated Stiller into the real world.

== Music ==
The martial folk song "Westerwaldlied" and standard German love song "Lili Marleen" are both featured in an extended scene in which Stiller seeks temporary respite in a cabaret. During the Siskins house party scene early in the movie, Ingrid Caven sings the song "The Boys in the Back Room". "The instrumental "Albatross" by Fleetwood Mac plays during the credits of both parts, as well as a scene in Part 2.

== Cast ==
- Klaus Löwitsch as Fred Stiller
- Mascha Rabben as Eva Vollmer
- Karl-Heinz Vosgerau as Herbert Siskins
- Adrian Hoven as Professor Henry Vollmer
- Ivan Desny as Günther Lause
- Barbara Valentin as Gloria Fromm
- Günter Lamprecht as Fritz Walfang
- Margit Carstensen as Maya Schmidt-Gentner
- Wolfgang Schenck as Franz Hahn
- Joachim Hansen as Hans Edelkern
- Gottfried John as Einstein
- Rudolf Lenz as Hartmann
- Kurt Raab as Mark Holm
- Karl Scheydt as Detective Stuhlfauth
- Ernst Küsters as a Bodyguard
- El Hedi ben Salem as a Bodyguard
- Rainer Hauer as Inspector Lehner
- Ulli Lommel as Rupp
- Heinz Meier as Von Weinlaub
- Peter Chatel as Hirse
- Ingrid Caven as Uschi
- Eddie Constantine as Man in car
- Rainer Langhans as Waiter at party

== Release ==
The original TV miniseries was shot at 16mm with PAL system, then the standard TV encoding system in much of the Europe. A restored version was shown at the 60th Berlin International Film Festival in 2010. It was also released on Region 2 DVD by Kinowelt/Arthaus as part of the Arthaus premium series and by Second Sight in the UK. It has since screened at the Melbourne International Film Festival, New York's Museum of Modern Art, Rochester, NY's Dryden Theatre, the Harvard Film Archive, San Francisco's Roxie Theater, the Cleveland Cinematheque, Nashville's Belcourt Theatre, the University of Colorado at Boulder's International Film Series, and the Los Angeles County Museum of Art in 2010 and 2011, as well as at The New Beverly Cinema in 2022.

The series was released on Blu-ray and two-disc DVD in the United States by The Criterion Collection in February 2012. It was released on Blu-ray in the UK by Second Sight in 2019 (limited edition) and 2021 (standard edition). The Criterion release runs at 24 frames per second while the Second Sight release runs at 25 frames per second as originally recorded.

== See also ==
- Simulacra and Simulation
- Simulacron-3
- Simulated reality
- Joan Is Awful
- The Thirteenth Floor
- Virtual reality
