= Fireflies in the Garden =

- Promotional poster
- Directed by: Dennis Lee
- Written by: Dennis Lee
- Produced by: Sukee Chew; Vanessa Coifman; Marco Weber
- Starring: Ryan Reynolds; Willem Dafoe; Emily Watson; Carrie-Anne Moss; Hayden Panettiere; Julia Roberts
- Cinematography: Daniel Moder
- Edited by: Dede Allen; Robert Brakey
- Music by: Javier Navarrete
- Distributed by: Senator Entertainment Inc.
- Release dates: February 10, 2008 (Berlin International Film Festival); October 14, 2011 (United States)
- Running time: 88 minutes
- Country: United States
- Language: English
- Budget: $8 million
- Box office: $3.4 million

Fireflies in the Garden is a 2008 American drama film written and directed by Dennis Lee and starring Willem Dafoe, Ryan Reynolds, and Julia Roberts. It premiered at the 2008 Berlin International Film Festival and was released theatrically in the United States on October 14, 2011.

Set in the present day, the film revolves around a three-generation family using numerous flashbacks to childhood, with focus on the relationship between domineering Charles and his son Michael and sister-in-law Jane. A car accident on the way to a family reunion and the ensuing funeral set the scene for Michael to discover more about the inner lives and affairs of his family and a route to reconciliation.

== Plot ==
English professor Charles and his son Michael, a successful author, have always had a strained relationship, with each pushing the other away. On a boyhood road trip, young Michael claims to have lost his glasses, knowing he has them in his pocket. Charles makes him walk home in the rain as punishment. The rule breaking and tit-for-tat continues over the years. Jane, the much younger sister of Charles's wife, Lisa, stays with them while Lisa is expecting. The baby "boy" later turns out to be a girl, Ryne. Jane has been close with Michael since childhood and sides with him against Charles.

Michael embarrasses Charles in front of the latter's colleagues by falsely claiming to have written Fireflies in the Garden, a poem by Robert Frost. Charles orders him to hold his weighted arms out horizontally as punishment. Jane later feeds Michael when he's unable to lift his aching arms. The conflicts build until Michael intervenes in a quarrel between his parents and forces Charles to the ground.

In present day, Ryne, now a college senior, picks up Michael at the airport. While Charles and Lisa drive to Jane's house for a party to celebrate Lisa's college graduation, Charles swerves to avoid hitting Christopher, Jane's son. The car hits a telephone pole, killing Lisa and severely injuring Charles.

Michael attempts to comfort Christopher and Leslie, Jane's daughter, by telling them Jane was his best friend before she was their mother. He takes them fishing with firecrackers, as he had with Jane growing up. He prompts them to lie to their mother about this. Jane chastises him lovingly after finding out, while Charles chastises him angrily. Things worsen when Michael has noisy sex with Kelly, his alcoholic ex-wife, who is there for the funeral.

Michael sees Christopher running off through a field and assures the latter he is not to blame for Lisa's death. Christopher insists on walking home alone after their talk, but disappears for several hours. Jane blames Michael, who deduces Christopher is at Lisa's grave. Michael discovers Lisa had been having an affair with her professor Addison and planning to leave Charles after graduation. Michael uses the title of the poem as the title of his book about his childhood. No longer wanting to hurt his father, Michael destroys his manuscript.

== Cast ==
- Ryan Reynolds as Michael Taylor
  - Cayden Boyd as Young Michael Taylor
- Willem Dafoe as Professor Charles "Charlie" Taylor
- Emily Watson as Jane Lawrence
  - Hayden Panettiere as Young Jane Lawrence
- Carrie-Anne Moss as Kelly Hanson
- Julia Roberts as Lisa Lawrence-Taylor
- Ioan Gruffudd as Addison Wesley
- Shannon Lucio as Ryne Taylor
- George Newbern as James "Jimmy" Lawence
- Chase Ellison as Christopher Lawrence
- Brooklynn Proulx as Leslie Lawrence

== Production ==
The film was shot in Austin (including the University of Texas), Bastrop, and Smithville, Texas. Lake Bastrop was the site of the fishing scene. The historic T. A. Hasler House in Bastrop was used significantly in the film.

== Music ==
Javier Navarrete composed the score heard in the European release version, but when it was released in the US in 2011 in a reedited form it received a new score by Jane Antonia Cornish. Both scores received soundtrack albums, Navarrete's by Decca and Cornish's by BSX.

=== Javier Navarrete soundtrack album ===
1. Town Of Austere 2:52
2. 11:11 4:07
3. Fireflies Blinking 1:49
4. A Swarm Of Silver Fish 5:06
5. The Light Of A Fire 3:24
6. Lisa 3:24
7. The Field Of Gold 5:33
8. Michael Smiles 2:15
9. Fireflies In The Garden Suite 8:26
10. Tchaikovsky: Piano Trio in A minor, Op.50 - 2. Variations - Vincent Trio 4:23

=== Jane Antonia Cornish soundtrack album ===
1. Fireflies in the Garden 1:02
2. Remembering Lisa 1:02
3. Stay Away from Her 1:37
4. Chasing Fireflies 1:02
5. Fishing 1:22
6. It's My Fault 3:03
7. Running Away 1:50
8. I Love You Big 2:16
9. Sex at a Funeral 1:16
10. Lisa :57
11. Paint Cans 1:46
12. Blowing up Fish 1:08
13. Tablecloth 1:00
14. Rules :46
15. Car Crash 1:02
16. Looking for Christopher 1:30
17. Eleven Eleven 1:04
18. I Love You Bigger 1:20

== Reception ==
The film has received mostly negative reviews from critics. As of January 2022, it holds a 23% approval rating on Rotten Tomatoes based on 53 reviews, with an average rating of 4.30/10. The consensus states: "Despite boasting a stellar cast, Fireflies in the Garden is just tedious, dull and predictable melodrama. Instantly forgettable." On Metacritic, the film has a weighted average score of 34 out of 100, based on 14 critics, indicating "generally unfavorable" reviews.
