= Unthinkable =

- Promotional poster
- Directed by: Gregor Jordan
- Written by: Peter Woodward
- Produced by: Marco Weber; Caldecot Chubb; Vanessa Coifman; Bill Perkins
- Starring: Samuel L. Jackson; Michael Sheen; Carrie-Anne Moss; Brandon Routh; Gil Bellows; Martin Donovan; Stephen Root
- Cinematography: Oliver Stapleton
- Edited by: Scott Chestnut
- Music by: Graeme Revell
- Production companies: Lleju Productions; Sidney Kimmel Entertainment; Kimmel International; ChubbCo Film; Senator Entertainment Co.
- Distributed by: Sony Pictures Home Entertainment; Senator U.S.
- Release date: June 14, 2010
- Running time: 97 minutes
- Country: United States
- Language: English
- Budget: $15 million
- Box office: $5.5 million

Unthinkable is a 2010 American thriller film directed by Gregor Jordan and starring Samuel L. Jackson, Michael Sheen, and Carrie-Anne Moss. It was released direct-to-video on June 14, 2010. The film focuses on the sanctioned torture of a man who has threatened to detonate three nuclear bombs, planted in three large U.S. cities.

== Plot ==
An American former Delta Force operator, Steven Younger, makes a videotape. Los Angeles-based FBI Special Agent Helen Brody and her team are summoned to a high school, commandeered by the military as a black site holding Younger (calling himself Yusuf Mohamed). They watch Yusuf's tape, showing three nuclear bombs in separate U.S. cities, timed for synchronous explosions if his demands are not met.

A special interrogator, "H", is brought in to force Yusuf to reveal the bombs' locations. H immediately shows his capability, cutting off one of Yusuf's fingers. Horrified, Brody attempts to put a stop to the measures. Her boss, Saunders, makes it clear that the threat of 10 million deaths necessitates the torture. H escalates his methods, with Brody acting as the "good cop". Yusuf then makes his demands: he wants the President of the United States to announce a cessation of support for puppet governments and dictatorships in Muslim countries and a withdrawal of American troops from there. The group immediately dismisses the possibility of his demands being met, citing the U.S. government's declared policy of not negotiating with terrorists.

When Brody accuses a broken Yusuf of faking the bomb threat in order to make a point about the moral character of the United States as a nation, he breaks down and admits that it was all a ruse, giving her an address to prove it. They find a room that matches the scene in the video tape, but no nuclear bomb. A soldier pulls Yusuf's picture down, which triggers a C-4 explosion at a nearby shopping mall, killing 53 people. Angry at the senseless deaths, Brody returns to Yusuf and cuts his chest with a scalpel. Yusuf is unafraid, and justifies the deaths in the shopping mall, stating that the Americans kill that many people every day. Yusuf says he allowed himself to be caught so he could face his oppressors.

Yusuf's wife and kids are detained, and H brings her in front of her husband and threatens to mutilate her right there. Brody and the others begin to take her away from the room in disgust, but H slashes her throat, and she bleeds to death in front of Yusuf. Yusuf does not break, so H has Yusuf's two children brought in. Outside of Yusuf's hearing, he assures everyone that he will not harm the children. He tells Yusuf that he will torture his children if the locations of the bombs are not divulged. Yusuf breaks and gives three addresses (in New York, Los Angeles, and Dallas), but H still prepares to torture the children, but the others forcefully stop him.

Citing the amount of missing nuclear material Yusuf potentially had at his disposal (some 18 lbs. were reported missing, with about 4½ lbs. needed per device), H insists that Yusuf had not admitted anything about a heretofore-unreferenced fourth bomb. H points out that everything Yusuf has done so far has been planned meticulously; Yusuf knew the torture might break him, and he would have been certain to plant an unexpected fourth bomb, just in case.

The purpose of the preceding torture was not to break Yusuf, but rather to make it clear what would happen to his children if he did not cooperate. The government official in charge of the operation – who helped attack H moments earlier – now demands that H torture Yusuf's children for the fourth bomb. H demands that Brody escort the children back, but she says that letting the fourth bomb kill millions is better than torturing two children. H sarcastically unties Yusuf. The official draws his pistol and aims it at H to coerce him into further interrogation. Yusuf grabs the official's gun, asks Brody to take care of his children, and kills himself. Brody walks out of the building with Yusuf's children.

=== Original/Alternate ending ===
An FBI bomb disposal unit disarms the Los Angeles nuclear bomb with only 12 seconds to spare. While they start to celebrate, the timer on the fourth nuclear bomb – hidden behind a nearby crate – hits zero.

== Cast ==
- Samuel L. Jackson as H
- Carrie-Anne Moss as Agent Helen Brody
- Michael Sheen as Steven Younger (a.k.a. Yusuf Mohamed)
- Martin Donovan as Director Saunders
- Stephen Root as Charlie Thomson
- Gil Bellows as Agent Vincent
- Randy Oglesby as Mr. Bradley
- Brandon Routh as Agent Jackson
- Joshua Harto as Agent Phillips
- Vincent Laresca as Agent Leandro
- Holmes Osborne as General Paulson
- Benito Martinez as Alvarez
- Sasha Roiz as Interrogator Lubitchich
- Lora Kojovic as Rina
- Michael Rose as Colonel Kerkmejian

== Production ==
In November 2006, it was reported that Sidney Kimmel Entertainment had signed Tarsem Singh to direct political thriller script Unthinkable written by Peter Woodward. In February 2008, David Slade had been signed as director after Tarsem Singh dropped out. Oren Moverman contributed to Woodward's screenplay during Slade's attachment to the project. In May of that year, it was reported that Gregor Jordan had signed on to direct and produce the film with Samuel L. Jackson attached to star. By September, Michael Sheen and Carrie-Anne Moss had joined the cast with shooting to begin that same month.

== Release ==
The film was released direct-to-video in June 2010, since no domestic distributor could be found after Senator Films, who financed the film, collapsed before its release. However, before the film's release, a DVD screening copy was leaked online and made available to download via torrent sites, with the film reaching 5th most torrented film on BitTorrent for the week ending May 23, 2010, and ranked 4th on IMDb's MovieMeter on June 11, 2010, days before its official release.

== Reception ==
Charles V. Peña, a policy advisor then at the Independent Institute, opined that "Ultimately, [Unthinkable] is about the age-old question, 'Do the ends justify the means?'... In the end, Unthinkable doesn’t answer the question... but does provide plenty of food for thought". Despite praising its dramatic value, film scholar Matthew Alford argues that "the aesthetic realism and apparent seriousness of Unthinkable is a mask for the absurdity of its content and reactionary politics" making it not so much a "nightmare scenario" and more "a white paper from Freddy Krueger". Film critic Joe Leydon also commented that the film "comes across as more earnest than exciting in dramatizing the ongoing debate over... the efficacy and morality of torture as an anti-terrorism weapon", arguing that whilst the interactions between characters are "passionately played", the dialogue "often sounds like excerpts from op-ed essays constructed from talking points."

In March 2024, Unthinkable entered Netflix's US Top 10 charts 14 years after its initial release.
