= The Infinite Man =

1973 novel by Daniel F. Galouye

- First edition cover, New York, 1973
- Author: Daniel F. Galouye
- Original title: The Infinite Man
- Cover artist: Lou Feck
- Language: English
- Series: A Bantam Book, N7130
- Genre: Science fiction novel
- Publisher: Bantam Books
- Publication date: 1973
- Publication place: United States
- English publication date: April, 1973
- Media type: Print (Paperback)
- Pages: 202
- ISBN: 0-553-07130-0
- OCLC: 572755
- Dewey Decimal: 813/.5/4
- LC Class: PZ4.G18 In PS3557.A42
- Preceded by: A Scourge of Screamers (1968)

The Infinite Man is a science fiction novel written by Daniel F. Galouye and published in April 1973 by Bantam Books.

== Plot ==
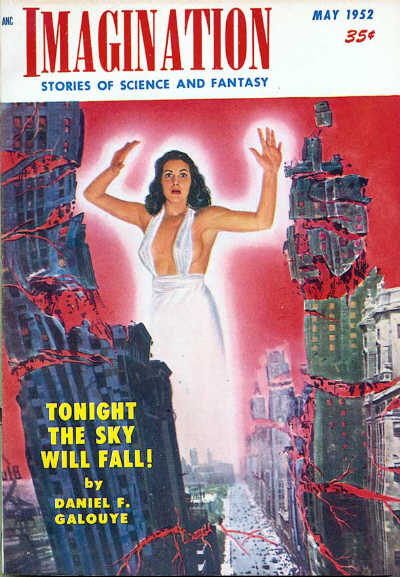
Galouye's novella "Tonight the Sky Will Fall!", incorporated into The Infinite Man, was the cover story for the May 1952 issue of Imagination

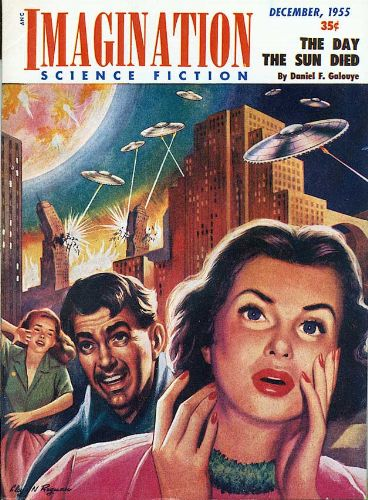
Galouye's novella "The Day the Sun Died", also incorporated into The Infinite Man, was the cover story for the December 1955 issue of Imagination

A research project, Project Genesis, searches for evidence confirming the Steady State Theory of continuous creation in the area within and surrounding an unnamed American Midwestern city, according to which, 125,000 newly created neutrons (also called neoneutrons, which decay into hydrogen atoms consisting of protons and electrons while giving off hard gamma radiation - here called creation-radiation) should be called into existence in an Earth-sized volume in a twenty-four-hour period. The monitored area is an equilateral triangle with thickness of 50 feet (15 m) and an area of 300 square miles (780 km^{2}) which should, by a proportional estimate, register twenty-one neoneutronic creation signatures in that same period.

Suddenly, not merely twenty-one, but millions of neoneutrons are called into existence in this monitoring area, fusing some of the sensor equipment. After replacing and refusing of the sensor elements, the locus of the phenomenon is traced to a rail-yard on the edge of the zone, and further, apparently emanating from a young drug-user and hobo, Milton Bradford.

Five years later, Milton Bradford (or, "Brad" to his inner circle) has gone from drug-using poverty to the pinnacle of corporate power as the Chairman of Progress and Development Enterprises (P&D), a real-estate and industrial conglomerate who functioned as an important partner during the days of the Genesis Project. P&D was formerly headed by Gerstal B. Hedgemore, who committed suicide in apparent shame when Bradford was confirmed as his illegitimate heir, consequently leaving him his worldly and corporate fortunes in his will. For the first two years of this time Bradford, now flush with wealth and time to spend it, lives the dream - even so far as to create a self-satirical rock group, Hocker's Mock Rockers, which is a wild success, providing even more income for P&D Enterprises. Five years in, however, Bradford is attempting to grow into his new role as powerful Chairman of a wealthy and powerful company.

The reality is that P&D Enterprises, while a real company, is solely devoted to providing a safe and contented existence for Bradford. For, earlier on, psychological probing has revealed to Project Genesis' staff that the phenomenon that led them to Bradford is in fact the Creative Force that brought the Universe into being in the first place, and (while not immediately clear to the Project staff) the Creative Force has sought Bradford as a hiding place from a Universe that has become tiresomely overwhelmingly complex and the Destructive Force whom the Creative Force had originally brought into being a self-made opponent to stave off ennui. The Creative Force now seeks shelter amongst its favored beings. Hedgemore did not commit suicide, but willingly abdicated his top position and lives in cloistered seclusion within the P&D buildings, never meeting Bradford.

In making a soft life for Bradford, the staff of P&D Enterprises hopes to keep the Creative Force somnolent, assuming that if the Force woke and was forced out of hiding physical laws would change to the point that the Universe might be annihilated. For those five years they were largely successful, however over this time Bradford has begun to put scattered parts together ... while P&D's work was very thorough, it was not complete, and at least a clue that Hedgemore had been sterile for years before Bradford's birth eventually surfaces.

Additionally, a cult worshipping Bradford has formed. Mixing elements of 1960s-style hippie movement, Buddhism, and rock and roll, it holds Bradford as the Messiah, the "Inverse Vessel" - instead of the Universe containing him, he contains the Universe. The sect, calling itself the Church of Topological Transformation, and led by a former member of a committee charged with oversight of Project Genesis, apply this reversal to everything they do, from dressing backwards as well as inside-out to reversing their names - the leader of the sect, Montague, is styled Eugatnom Tehporp - "Prophet Montague", reversed.

Between the adoration of the cult, which its leader has increasing trouble restraining, and the staff of P&D, psychologically exhausted from years of maintaining the P&D fiction against the utter destruction of the Universe, the cracks in the cover story develop and widen, and the Creative Force arouses and begins to try to simplify the Universe in order to make it more manageable - though not uninhabitable for its chosen residents; from the original confirmatory nova of Proxima Centauri and destruction of Pluto, it deletes all quasars observable in the Universe; rationalizes pi at the 323rd decimal; halves the speed of light; and changes probability so that outcomes bracketing the mean become more likely than the mean itself. These revisions to physical reality typically happen after dreams; the quasars are seen in Bradford's dreams as "glowflies", as an example; and the halving of the speed of light is expressed as "half a sea". While these cause some upheaval in everyday life humanity still survives on Earth - until the final battle comes between the Creative Force, inhabiting Bradford, and the Destructive Force - who had, during all this time, been inhabiting and guiding Bradford's psychiatrist, Dr. Power, seeking to draw him out, and becoming his corporeal adversary in the end.

== See also ==
- List of science fiction novels
- Mind transfer in fiction
- Superhuman
