= Jay Scheib =

American stage director, playwright and artist (born 1969)

- Born: October 6, 1969 (age 56); Shenandoah, Iowa, U.S.
- Education: University of Minnesota, Twin Cities (BA); Columbia University (MFA)

Jay Scheib (born October 6, 1969) is an American stage director, playwright, and artist known for his contemporary productions of both classical and new plays and operas. He is a Professor of Music and Theater Arts and chairs the Music & Theater Arts programs at the Massachusetts Institute of Technology where he teaches performance media, live cinema performance, directing, motion theater, augmenting opera, and beyond the expanded cinema. Scheib has been a regular guest professor at the Mozarteum, Thomas Bernhard Institut, Abteilung für Regie und Schauspiel in Salzburg, Austria, where he conducted an annual "viewpoints and composition" studio.

== Biography ==
=== Early career ===
Scheib was born in Shenandoah, Iowa and attended the University of Minnesota. In 1997 he entered Columbia University School of the Arts from where he later received his Master of Fine Arts degree in Theater Directing. He began his career in Minneapolis, Minnesota with a 1991 production of Antonin Artaud's Le Jet du Sang followed by a commission from the International Festival of Free Theaters in Szeged, Hungary where Scheib was to premiere The Seasonal. He went on to co-found The American Theater Institute, which eventually became The Arcade Studio. Productions here included: The Kingdom, The Suicide, Poems for the Theater, The Device Machine, Lendra // Revolute, John Day, Galileo Sidereal, Witkacy's The Madman and the Nun, Heiner Müller's Mommsen's Block, The Battle (Die Schlacht), Prolegomenon, and Pickaxe.

=== Awards and honours ===
Scheib's work as a theater and opera director has been seen in the United States, United Kingdom, Canada, Germany, France, Norway, Finland, Turkey, Netherlands, Czech Republic, Hong Kong, China, Hungary, Serbia, Slovenia, Italy, and Austria. Known for his sometimes controversial contemporary stagings, and for pioneering his Live Cinema Performances he has won numerous awards including the 2012 Obie Award for Best Director, and a 2011 Guggenheim Fellowship, the Richard Sherwood Award from the Mark Taper Forum, The National Endowment for the Arts / Theater Communications Group Program for Directors, and the Edgerton Award from the Massachusetts Institute of Technology. In 2009 Scheib was named by American Theater Magazine as one of the 25 Artists who will shape the next 25 years of American Theater. Most recently Scheib's production of Bat Out of Hell won London's Evening Standard Award for Best Musical. For Scheib's staging of Bat Out of Hell he has been nominated for Best Director for the 2017 WhatsOnStage Award.

=== Recent works ===
Scheib's opera and music theatrical works include Richard Wagner's "Parsifal" at the Bayreuther Festspiele 2023-2026, and the virtual reality experience "Sie Siegfried" also with the Bayreuther Festspiele. Jim Steinman's Bat Out of Hell. Bat Out of Hell began previews at the London Coliseum on June 5, 2017, ahead of an official opening on June 20 and ran until August 22, 2017. Bat Out of Hell made its North American premiere at the Ed Mirvish Theatre on October 14, 2017, and ran through January 7, 2018. On its final performance, the cast announced a return to London at the Dominion Theatre in 2018 for an open-ended West End run. Scheib also recently directed Persona, after the film by Ingmar Bergman composed by Keeril Makan with libretto and direction by Jay Scheib. Other productions include Addicted to Bad Ideas, the post-punk "lieder abend" about the life and times of Peter Lorre with The World/Inferno Friendship Society. The production premiered at the Philadelphia Festival of Live Arts and went on to tour numerous venues and festivals including the Luminato Festival in Toronto, The Urban Festival, Helsinki, Spoleto Festival, USA, Under the Radar Festival / New York Public Theater, Peak Performances, and the Noorderzon Performing Arts Festival in Groningen, Netherlands. He also directed Evan Ziporyn's Live Cinema opera A House in Bali at Cal Performances, Berkeley CA, Cutler Majestic Theater, Boston and the Brooklyn Academy of Music, Brooklyn, New York in fall 2010 featuring contemporary music ensemble Bang on a Can and Gamelan Salukat led by Dewa Ketut Alit. Scheib has also staged the world premiere of Irena Popovich's Mozart Luster Lustik at the Sava Center in Belgrade, carried out the libretto direction and media design for The Making of Americans at the Walker Art Center based on the novel by Gertrude Stein and staged the five part Novaflot opera saga Kommander Kobayashi composed by Moritz Eggert, Aleksandra Gryka, Ricardas Kabelis, Juha Koskinen and Helmut Oehring, and conducted by Jonathan Kaell at the Saarland State Theatre in Saarbrücken.

Scheib's theatrical productions include Brecht's Puntila und sein Knecht Matti at the Theater Augsburg in Germany; Tolstoy's The Power of Darkness at the Trafo House of Contemporary Art in Budapest, Daniel Veronese's Women Dreamt Horses at Performance Space 122, Vallejo Gantner Artistic Director, Chuck Mee's Iphigenia at the Norwegian Theater Institute, Lothar Trolle's Fernsehen 3 and Ein Vormittag in der Freiheit at the Volksbühne am Rosa Luxemburg Platz in Berlin.

Also known for his Live Cinema adaptations of novels, films, and non-theatrical events, Scheib's staged adaptations include: Bellona, Destroyer of Cities adapted from Samuel R. Delany's novel, Dhalgren at The Kitchen in New York,Samuel R. Delany and Jay Scheib discuss Bellona, Destroyer of Cities with Ashley Crawford, World of Wires (2012) adapted from the science fiction film World on a Wire, Untitled Mars (This Title May Change) adapted from Lassewitz, Dick, Lem and the activities of the Mars Desert Research Station in Utah which premiered at Performance Space 122 in New York. His live-cinema adaptation of Antonioni's works This Place is a Desert was first performed as a workshop with the Kretakor Ensemble in Budapest followed by a studio presentation at Massachusetts Institute of Technology before its world premiere at the Institute of Contemporary Art in Boston and its subsequent sold-out run at the Public Theater as part of the Under the Radar Festival. Other adaptations include Margarethhamlet, which premiered in Berlin and All Good Everything Good after Shakespeare's All's Well That Ends Well which premiered in Bologna at Raum. Both Shakespeare adaptations were choreographed for a solo performer on guitar and were presented with Margareth Kammerer.

The New York City Opera presented the opera, Powder Her Face, by Thomas Adès, in February 2013 at the Brooklyn Academy of Music in a production directed by Jay Scheib.
