= Jim Steinman discography =

This is the discography of Jim Steinman, an American record producer, composer and lyricist, responsible for several hit songs. He also worked as an arranger, pianist, and singer. His work includes songs in the adult contemporary, rock and roll, dance, pop, musical theater, and film score genres.

== Albums ==
Albums in which Steinman participated in all songs.

Date	Title	Band/Artist	role
1977	Bat Out of Hell	Meat Loaf	composer, vocals
1981	Bad for Good	Himself	lead vocals, writer, arranger, producer, keyboards
1981	Dead Ringer	Meat Loaf	producer, composer, vocals
1983	Faster Than the Speed of Night	Bonnie Tyler	producer, composer, arranger
1984	Signs of Life	Billy Squier	producer
1986	Secret Dreams and Forbidden Fire	Bonnie Tyler	producer, composer, arranger
1989	Original Sin	Pandora's Box	producer, composer, keyboards
1993	Bat Out of Hell II: Back into Hell	Meat Loaf	producer, composer, arranger, vocals
2016	Braver Than We Are	Meat Loaf	composer, arranger, creative consultant

== Other songs ==
Songs not released in the albums above.

Date	Song	Band/Artist	Album
as Composer
1973	"Happy Ending"	Yvonne Elliman	Food of Love
1980	A Small Circle of Friends	Jim Steinman	Soundtrack
1983	"Read 'Em and Weep"	Barry Manilow	Greatest Hits, Vol. II
1983	"Making Love Out of Nothing at All"	Air Supply	Greatest Hits
1984	"Holding Out for a Hero"	Bonnie Tyler	Footloose soundtrack
1984	"Nowhere Fast"	Fire Inc.	Streets of Fire soundtrack
1984	"Tonight Is What It Means to Be Young"	Fire Inc.	Streets of Fire soundtrack
1984	"Left in the Dark"	Barbra Streisand	Emotion
1985	"Nowhere Fast"	Meat Loaf	Bad Attitude
1985	"Surf's Up"	Meat Loaf	Bad Attitude
1985	"Hulk Hogan's Theme"	Various artists	The Wrestling Album
1987	"This Corrosion"	The Sisters of Mercy	Floodland
1987	"Dominion/Mother Russia"	The Sisters of Mercy	Floodland
1989	"Darling Be Home Soon"	Phoebe Snow	Rude Awakening soundtrack
1989	"Rude Awakening"	Bill Medley	Rude Awakening soundtrack
1990	"More"	The Sisters of Mercy	Vision Thing
1994	"Original Sin"	Taylor Dayne	The Shadow
1995	"Original Sin"	Meat Loaf	Welcome to the Neighbourhood
1995	"Left in the Dark"	Meat Loaf	Welcome to the Neighbourhood
1995	"Making Love Out of Nothing at All"	Bonnie Tyler	Free Spirit
1995	"Two Out of Three Ain't Bad"	Bonnie Tyler	Free Spirit
1996	"It's All Coming Back To Me Now"	Celine Dion	Falling into You
1998	"Try Not To Be Afraid"	Boy George	Whistle Down The Wind
1998	"No Matter What"	Boyzone	Where We Belong
1998	"Home by Now/No Matter What"	Meat Loaf	The Very Best of Meat Loaf
1998	"Is Nothing Sacred"	Meat Loaf	The Very Best of Meat Loaf
1999	"Is Nothing Sacred"	Meat Loaf feat. Patti Russo	UK Single
2002	"Is Nothing Sacred"	Russell Watson	Reprise
2003	Wuthering Heights	Jim Steinman	Composer/producer
2005	"Letter To Pun"	Cuban Link	Chain Reaction
2005	"A Kiss Is A Terrible Thing To Waste"	The Everly Brothers	On the Wings of a Nightingale: The Mercury Studio Recordings
2006	"It's All Coming Back To Me Now"	Meat Loaf	Bat Out of Hell III: The Monster Is Loose
2006	"Bad For Good"	Meat Loaf	Bat Out of Hell III: The Monster Is Loose
2006	"In The Land Of The Pig, The Butcher Is King"	Meat Loaf	Bat Out of Hell III: The Monster Is Loose
2006	"If It Ain't Broke, Break It"	Meat Loaf	Bat Out of Hell III: The Monster Is Loose
2006	"Seize The Night"	Meat Loaf	Bat Out of Hell III: The Monster Is Loose
2006	"The Future Ain't What It Used to Be"	Meat Loaf	Bat Out of Hell III: The Monster Is Loose
2006	"Cry To Heaven"	Meat Loaf	Bat Out of Hell III: The Monster Is Loose
as producer only
1986	"Love Can Make You Cry"	Urgent	Iron Eagle
1992	"Bring Me The Head Of Jerry Garcia"	Iron Prostate	
1995	"Never Forget"	Take That	Nobody Else
1996	"Call The Man"	Celine Dion	Falling into You
1996	"River Deep, Mountain High"	Celine Dion	Falling into You
1997	"Us"	Celine Dion	Let's Talk About Love
1997	"In The Dark Of The Night"		Anastasia
1997	"I Want To Spend My Lifetime Loving You"	Tina Arena & Marc Anthony	The Mask of Zorro
2002	"Vittoria!"	Opera Babes	Beyond Imagination

== Musicals ==
- A Man's a Man (1967)
- Baal (1968)
- The Beard (1968)
- The Dream Engine (1969)
- More Than You Deserve (1973)
- Rhinegold (1974)
- The Confidence Man (1976)
- Neverland (1977)
- Whistle Down the Wind (1996)
- Tanz der Vampire (1997)
- Bat Out of Hell The Musical (2017)
