= Dark Universe (novel) =

1961 novel by Daniel F. Galouye

- First edition cover, New York, 1961
- Author: Daniel F. Galouye
- Original title: Dark Universe
- Cover artist: V. A. Hoot
- Language: English
- Genre: Science fiction novel
- Publisher: Bantam Books
- Publication date: 1961
- Publication place: United States
- English publication date: September 1961
- Media type: Print (paperback)
- Pages: 154 pp
- ISBN: 978-0839823339
- OCLC: 2391138
- Dewey Decimal: 813/.5/4
- LC Class: PZ4.G18 Dar7, PS3557.A42 Dar7
- Followed by: Lords of the Psychon (1963)

Dark Universe is a post-apocalyptic science fiction novel by Daniel F. Galouye, first published in 1961. It is currently in publication by Victor Gollancz Ltd as a collector's edition.

The book was nominated for a Hugo Award in 1962.

== Plot summary ==
The Survivors live deep underground in a world of complete darkness, divided into two clans, one living in the Lower Level and one in the Upper Level. Their legends tell of the Original World where man lived alongside the Light Almighty (a concept of which they can no longer conceive) and away from the ultimate evil, Radiation, with its two Lieutenants the Twin Devils Cobalt and Strontium. The Lower Level Survivors venerate a relic known as the Holy Bulb. "So compassionate was the Almighty (it was the Guardian of the Way's voice that came back [to Jared] now) that when He banished man from Paradise, He sent parts of Himself to be with us for a while. And He dwelled in many little vessels like this Holy Bulb."

Jared is the son of the Prime Survivor, the leader of the Lower Level clan. He is himself due to become a Survivor (i.e. an adult clansman), but Jared is too busy with his quest to find Light. He rationalizes that to find distant Light he must first locate its opposite, Darkness, which is near and "abounds in the worlds of men!" He goes on to theorize that:

"Darkness must be something real. Only, we can't recognize it."

...

"There's a clue [however]. We know that in the Original World - the first world that man inhabited after he left Paradise - we were closer to Light Almighty. In other words, it was a good world. Now let's suppose there's some sort of connection between sin and evil and this Darkness stuff. That means there must be less Darkness in the Original World, Right?"

...

"Then all I have to do is find something there's less of in the Original World [than there is here]."

...

"If Darkness is connected with evil and if Light is its opposite, then Light must be good. And if I find Darkness, then I may have some kind of idea as to the nature of Light."

By leaving the safety of the central echo-caster, with only a pair of click stones with which to listen, Jared exposes himself to soubat (once common cave bats that either "Cobalt or Strontium took ... down to Radiation and made [them] over into ... super-creature[s]") and Zivvers (people with an apparently unfathomable ability to navigate despite having poor hearing compared to the Survivors; it turns out that Zivvers navigate in darkness using infrared, while Survivors use echolocation). The soubats and Zivvers are thought of as similar, or even related, by the Survivors because of their similar abilities. "It was an uncanny ability nobody could explain, except to say [soubats and Zivvers] were possessed of Cobalt or Strontium."

Jared's quest for Light is interrupted by unexplained disappearances and an arranged marriage to Della, a girl from the Upper Level, the daughter of their chief 'the Wheel'. Things get progressively worse as strange monsters roam the world and the hot springs begin to dry up. Along with his betrothed, Jared sets out for the Zivver world, hoping it will bring him closer to Light, instead they find themselves fleeing from the monsters once again, and being pushed closer to the Original World.
