= Martin Weisz =

German director (born 1966)

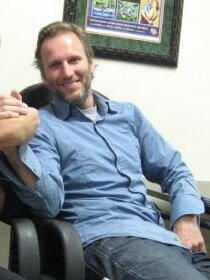
- Weisz in 2010
- Born: 27 March 1966 (age 60); Berlin, Germany
- Occupations: Music video and film director

Martin Weisz (born 27 March 1966) is a German music video and film director. He has directed over 350 videos and worked with artists such as Nickelback, Brandy, Puff Daddy, and LL Cool J. He has also directed numerous commercials.

Weisz won an MTV Europe Music Award for Best Dance Video and was nominated for Best Rock Video in 2000.

He made his debut as a film director with the controversial 2006 film Rohtenburg (called Grimm Love in the United States), which is banned in some areas of Germany. His second film, The Hills Have Eyes 2, debuted in theaters in 2007. His third film, Squatters, debuted in theaters on 13 May 2014.

Weisz is married and has four children.
