= The Thirteenth Floor =

1999 film by Josef Rusnak

- Theatrical release poster
- Directed by: Josef Rusnak
- Screenplay by: Josef Rusnak; Ravel Centeno-Rodriguez
- Based on: Simulacron-3 by Daniel F. Galouye; World on a Wire by Rainer Werner Fassbinder
- Produced by: Roland Emmerich; Ute Emmerich; Marco Weber
- Starring: Craig Bierko; Gretchen Mol; Vincent D'Onofrio; Dennis Haysbert; Armin Mueller-Stahl
- Cinematography: Wedigo von Schultzendorff
- Edited by: Henry Richardson
- Music by: Harald Kloser
- Production company: Centropolis Entertainment
- Distributed by: Columbia Pictures (International); Jugendfilm 20th Century Fox (Germany)
- Release dates: April 16, 1999 (Denmark); May 28, 1999 (United States); November 25, 1999 (Germany)
- Running time: 100 minutes
- Countries: United States; Germany
- Language: English
- Budget: $16 million
- Box office: $18.5 million

The Thirteenth Floor is a 1999 science fiction thriller film written and directed by Josef Rusnak and produced by Roland Emmerich’s Centropolis Entertainment. Loosely based on Daniel F. Galouye’s 1964 novel, Simulacron-3, it is a remake of Rainer Werner Fassbinder’s 1973 miniseries World on a Wire. The film stars Craig Bierko, Gretchen Mol, Armin Mueller-Stahl, Vincent D'Onofrio, and Dennis Haysbert. In 2000, The Thirteenth Floor was nominated for the Saturn Award for Best Science Fiction Film but lost to The Matrix.

== Plot ==
In 1999 Los Angeles, Hannon Fuller owns a multibillion-dollar computer enterprise and is the inventor of a newly completed virtual reality (VR) simulation of 1937 Los Angeles, filled with simulated humans unaware they are computer programs. When Fuller is murdered just as he begins premature testing of the VR system, his friend and protégé, Douglas Hall, who is also the heir to the company, becomes the primary suspect. The evidence against him is so strong that Hall begins to doubt his own innocence.

Between interrogations by LAPD Detective Larry McBain, Hall meets Jane Fuller, Hannon's estranged daughter, who intends to shut down the new VR system. Hall then romances her. When a local bartender is murdered after he claims to have witnessed a meeting between Hall and Fuller on the night Fuller was murdered, Hall is arrested. He is released when Jane gives him an alibi.

With the assistance of his associate Jason Whitney, Hall attempts to find a message that Fuller left for him inside the simulation. Entering the virtual reality, Hall becomes a bank clerk named John Ferguson. Hall learns that Fuller left the message with a bartender named Jerry Ashton, who read the message and discovered he is an artificial creation. Ashton becomes suspicious of Hall, as once Hall leaps out of Ferguson in the men's restroom of the hotel where Ashton works, Ferguson does not know where he is. When Hall enters the simulation later, he goes to Ashton and asks about the letter. Frightened and angry about the true nature of his world, Ashton tries to kill Hall. Hall barely survives to escape the VR.

McBain informs Hall that Jane does not exist, as Fuller never had a daughter. Hall tracks her down only to discover her double, Natasha Molinaro, working as a grocery store clerk, but Molinaro does not recognize Hall. This leads Hall to perform an experiment outside the VR system, something that Fuller's message instructed him to try: drive to a place where he never would have considered going otherwise. He does so, and discovers a point beyond which the world becomes a crude wireframe model. Hall grasps the intended revelation behind Fuller's message: 1999 Los Angeles is itself a simulation.

Jane explains the truth to Hall: his world is one of thousands of virtual worlds, but it is the only one in which one of the occupants has developed a virtual world of their own. Jane Fuller lives in the real world outside the 1990s Los Angeles simulation. After Fuller's death, she entered the virtual version to assume the guise of Fuller's daughter, gain control of the company, and shut down the simulated 1937 reality, a plan foiled by Hall being made the company heir. The virtual Hall is modeled after David, Jane's real-world husband, though Jane has since fallen in love with Hall. David committed the murders via Hall's body, being driven to increasingly jealous and psychopathic behavior from prolonged use of VR to live out his dark fantasies.

Whitney enters the 1937 simulation as Ashton, who has kidnapped Ferguson and bound him in the trunk of his car. When Whitney is killed in a car crash inside the 1937 simulation, Ashton's consciousness takes control of Whitney's body in the 1990s simulation and takes Hall hostage. Hall tells Ashton that he is not in the real world, and that they are both products of a VR simulation. Hall takes Ashton to the place where he was 'born': a computer lab. David assumes control of Hall again to kill Ashton and then attempts to rape and murder Jane. Jane is rescued by Detective McBain, who shoots and kills David. McBain at this point has realized the nature of his own reality, and jokingly asks Jane if someone will unplug him. She answers "no", so McBain requests that Jane never meddle with the simulation again.

David's death as Hall in the 1990s simulation allows Hall's consciousness to take control of David's body in the real world. He wakes in 2024, connected to a VR system. He disconnects the system and finds Jane and her father, upon whom Hannon Fuller was modeled. Jane wants to tell Hall all about the simulation, and just as she begins, the film ends; the screen image collapses to a thin line of light before going dark, like a computer monitor being turned off.

== Cast ==
Actor	1937	1999	2024
Craig Bierko	John Ferguson	Douglas Hall	David
Gretchen Mol		Natasha Molinaro	Jane Fuller
Armin Mueller-Stahl	Grierson	Hannon Fuller	Jane's father
Vincent D'Onofrio	Jerry Ashton	Jason Whitney	
Dennis Haysbert		Detective Larry McBain	
Shiri Appleby	Bridget Manila		
Leon Rippy		Jane's Lawyer	
Rif Hutton		Joe	
Jeremy Roberts		Tom Jones	
Janet MacLachlan		Ellen	
Steve Schub		Detective Zev Bernstein	
Alison Lohman	Honey Bear Girl		

== Production ==
The film is adapted from the 1964 science fiction novel Simulacron-3 by Daniel F. Galouye which had previously been adapted for German television as World on a Wire in 1973. Producers Marco Weber and Roland Emmerich were drawn to adapt the story as both had seen the original television adaptation during its initial broadcast. Josef Rusnak was hired after serving as second unit director on Godzilla and Weber and Emmerich impressed with Rusnak's camera work.

== Release ==
The Thirteenth Floor was first released in Denmark on April 16, 1999, followed by a North American release on May 28, 1999. It grossed $11.9 million in North America, and $18.5 million worldwide. The Thirteenth Floor was released on DVD on October 5, 1999, and on Blu-ray on April 14, 2009.

== Reception ==
On the review aggregator website Rotten Tomatoes, 29% of 63 critics' reviews are positive, with an average rating of 4.5/10. The website's consensus reads: "Bad script and confusing plot undermine the movie's impressive visuals." Metacritic, which uses a weighted average, assigned the film a score of 36 out of 100, based on 22 critics, indicating "generally unfavorable" reviews. Audiences polled by CinemaScore gave the film an average grade of "D+" on an A+ to F scale.

Philosopher Slavoj Žižek called the film "much better than The Matrix".

=== Accolades ===
It was nominated for a Saturn Award in the Best Science Fiction Film category.

== See also ==
- Brain in a vat
- eXistenZ, 1999 film
- Simulated reality
- The Matrix
- World on a Wire, 1973 Television film based on the same book
