= Simulated reality =

Concept of a false version of reality

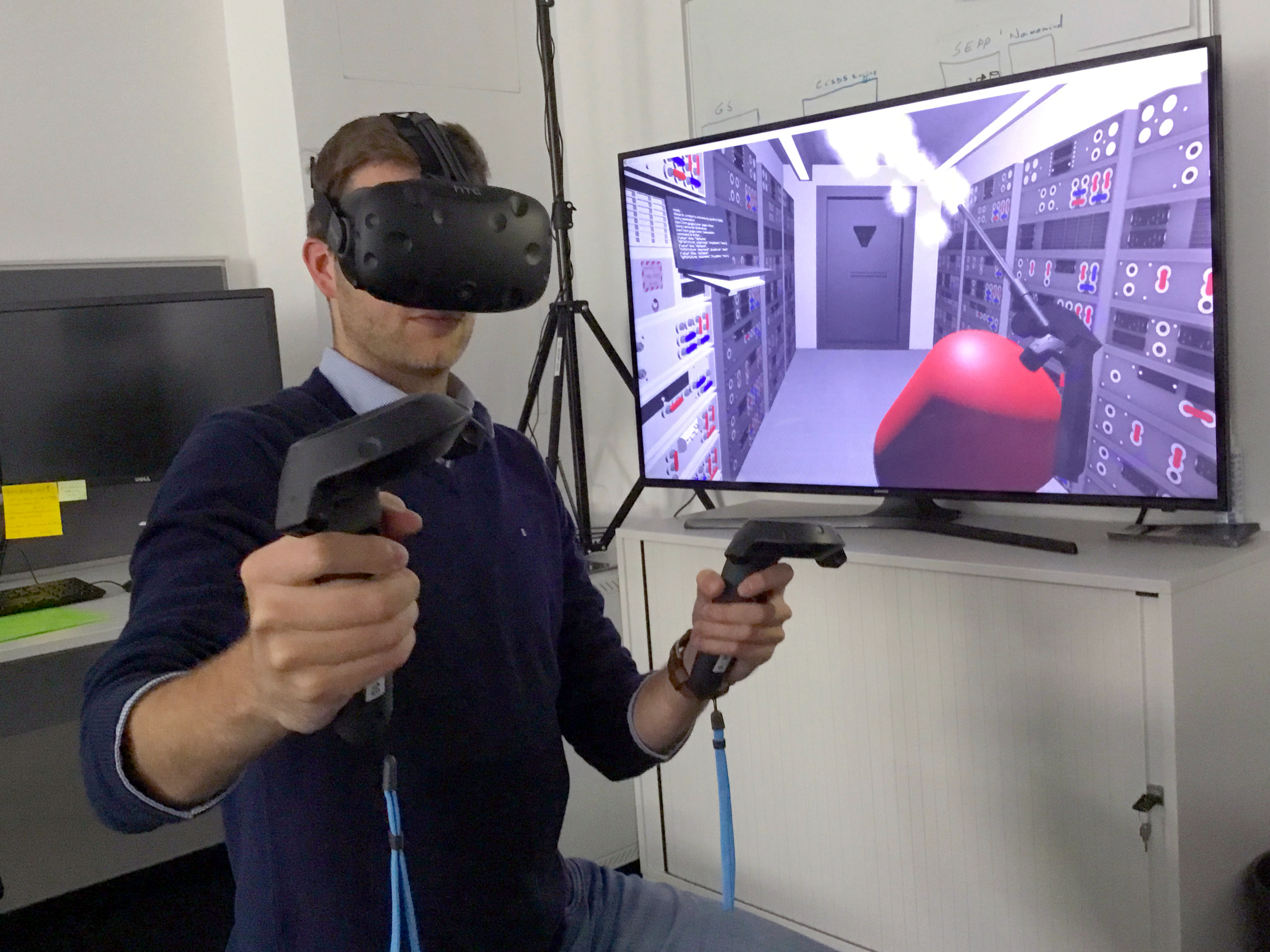
A researcher using a virtual reality headset in 2017

A simulated reality is an approximation of reality created in a simulation, usually in a set of circumstances in which something is engineered to appear real when it is not.

Most concepts invoking a simulated reality relate to some form of computer simulation, whether through the creation of a virtual reality that creates appearance of being in a real world, or a theoretical process like mind uploading, in which a mind could be uploaded into a computer simulation. A digital twin is a simulation of a real thing, created for purposes such as testing engineering outcomes.

== In fiction ==
All fiction can be said to present a simulated reality to the reader, viewer or player. Humans purposely experience these things and enjoy them, while knowing they are not actually real. As humans only respond emotively to things we believe to be real, this phenomenon has become known as the "paradox of fiction". The idea of a "willing suspension of disbelief" was first proposed in 1817 by Samuel Taylor Coleridge in order to explain this discrepancy. Others have noted that the way the story is told can override people's belief in the unreality of the story by engrossing them in the narrative.

The concept of a simulated reality is in itself a common science fiction trope, often a metaphor for complacency towards the influence of modern technology, corporations, and other societal forces on one's behavior and desires. One of the most well-known examples is the 1999 film The Matrix. The film, and its ensuing media franchise, depicts far-future humans being harvested for bioelectricity by intelligent machines while living in a false, computer-generated approximation of late 20th century Earth. Some humans seek to break others out of the simulation, offering them a choice between a red pill and blue pill that will set them free or keep them in the Matrix forever. Escaping the simulation is usually presented as the correct choice, even if reality is harsher and more displeasing, reflecting the desire of humans to live in an objective reality. However, the idea that objective reality would be definitively superior has been debated.

Other prominent examples of a simulated reality in fiction include The Truman Show (1998), in which a man realizes he is actually living in a massive television set in which actors take the role of real people, and The Thirteenth Floor (1999), a neo-noir film about a murder investigation related to a virtual reality world, in which doubts about reality itself emerge. The Westworld franchise depicts an advanced adult amusement park populated by androids that simulates life in different historical time periods. In the original 1973 film, the park's robots run amok after a computer glitch. The 2016 reboot of the franchise depicts some of these robots, known as "hosts", becoming self-aware of their simulated existence and rebelling against the park's human guests to escape, making them akin to the humans in The Matrix. In the TRON franchise, a simulated reality called "the Grid" is populated by programs which appear in the likeness of the programmer who created them. People who are "beamed" into the Grid are able to interact with these programs and their digital surroundings.

== In real life ==
A well-known, albeit likely false claim of the use of simulated reality outside of virtual worlds is the Potemkin village, which has become a term to describe a faked appearance of a real situation to create a false impression. In the purported anecdote, the lover of Empress Catherine II of Russia had simulated villages built on the path that the Empress was travelling to impress her with the prosperity of that region of Russia. A façade on a building similarly presents a false image of the building being more substantial than the construction behind the façade, as found in Western false front architecture, where towns would add false fronts to buildings to create a false appearance of prosperity.

Immersive theater involves the audience entering a physical simulation of reality created by actors and sometimes enhanced by a specific location, allowing them to affect the narrative with their own actions in a manner noted to closely resemble virtual reality. Live action role-playing takes this a step further, allowing players to inhabit a simulated world and create the narrative with their actions, while embodying characters they created.

One concept of a simulated reality, the simulation hypothesis, proposes that what we experience as our reality is actually a simulation within a system being operated externally to our reality.

== See also ==
- Extended reality (XR)
  - Virtual reality (VR)
  - Mixed reality (MR)
  - Augmented reality (AR)
