= List of animated package films =

This is a list of animated package films. There are two types of package films — a film with little or no new animation; usually there is only new bridge animation to link older theatrical/TV shorts together, for example Daffy Duck's Quackbusters. The other type has all-new animation and might not always feature bridge animation. Melody Time doesn't feature bridge animation, but The Three Caballeros does. Home video releases of older theatrical and TV shorts or TV series are usually released as compilations and might therefore be thought of as packaged, but are usually not considered as such.

== List ==
Film	Country	Date (YYYY-MM-DD)	Length (min)	# of segments
The Academy Award Review of Walt Disney Cartoons	United States	1937-05-19	41-74	5–9
The Adventures of Ichabod and Mr. Toad	United States	1949-10-05	68	2
An All New Adventure of Disney's Sport Goofy	United States	1987-05-27	47	8
All Star Cartoon Revue	United States	1979-11-23	77	11
Allegro Non Troppo	Italy	1977-07-27	85	6
Amazing Nuts!	Japan	2006-12-20	15:26	4
Ancient Alien	United States	1998-07-10	45	?
Ani*Kuri15 アニ＊クリ15	Japan	2008-01-01	15	15
Animation Celebration	United States	1986-XX-XX	96	24
The Animation Celebration Volume Two	United States	1990-XX-XX	100	17
The Animation Celebration Volume Three	United States	1990-12-26	90	18
The Animation Show	United States	2003-11-01	94	23
The Animation Show 2005	United States	2005-11-08	85	14
The Animation Show 2007	United States	2007-01-17	94	13
The Animatrix	United States/Japan	2003-06-03	102	9
Animusic: A Computer Animation Video Album	United States	2001-02-26	33	7
Animusic 2: A New Computer Animation Video Album	United States	2005-10-04	?	8
Batman: Gotham Knight	United States	2008-07-08	76	6
Belle's Magical World	United States	1998-02-15	70 (original release); 92 (special edition)	4
Beyond the Mind's Eye	United States	1993-04-19	50	11
The Big Fun Carnival	United States	1957-01-20	90	6
Bosko's Picture Show	United States	1933-09-18	6	3
The Bugs Bunny/Road Runner Movie	United States	1979-09-14	98	21
Bugs Bunny Cartoon Revue	United States	1953-XX-XX	?	?
Bugs Bunny: Superstar	United States	1975-12-19	90	9
Bugs Bunny in Space	United States	1977-09-06	30	9
The Bugs Bunny Mystery Special	United States	1980-10-15	30	8
Bugs Bunny's 3rd Movie: 1001 Rabbit Tales	United States	1982-11-19	74	12
Bugs Bunny's Easter Special	United States	1977-04-07	30	5
Bugs Bunny's Howl-oween Special	United States	1977-10-26	30	9
Bugs Bunny's Thanksgiving Diet	United States	1979-11-15	30	9
Bugs vs. Daffy: Battle of the Music Video Stars	United States	1988-10-21	23	24
Casper and Wendy's Ghostly Adventures	United States	2002-07-30	82	14
Cinderella II: Dreams Come True	United States	2002-02-26	73	3
A Corny Concerto	United States	1943-09-25	8	2
Coyote Tales	United States	1991-03-24	79	27
Customers Wanted	United States	1936-01-27	7	2
The Czech Year; Spalicek	Czechoslovakia	1947-06-09	75	6
Daffy Duck's Fantastic Island	United States	1983-08-05	78	10
Daffy Duck's Quackbusters	United States	1988-09-24	72	11
Dante's Inferno: An Animated Epic	United States	2010-02-09	88	?
Devil's Feud Cake	United States	1963-02-09	7	3
Digital Juice	Japan	2002-01-25	20	6
A Disney Halloween	United States	1983-10-01	90	23
Disney Princess Enchanted Tales: Follow Your Dreams	United States	2007-09-04	56	2
Disney's American Legends	United States	2002-02-12	58	4
Doing Impossikible Stunts	United States	1940-08-02	7	4
Donald and His Duckling Gang	United States	1977-11-19	70	10
Donald Duck and his Companions	United States	1960-01-01	80	?
Donald Duck Goes West	United States	1965-09-19	57	11
Donald Duck's Cartoon Mania	United States	1978-07-16	78	11
Donald Duck's Frantic Antic	United States	1975-08-27	92	9
Donald Duck's Fun Festival	United States	1976-01-01	63	10
Donald Duck's Summer Magic	United States	1977-07-23	75	8
Donkey Kong Country: The Legend of the Crystal Coconut	United States	1999-09-16	88	4
Down and Out with Donald Duck	United States	1987-03-25	60	39
Droids: The Pirates and the Prince	United States/Canada	1997-02-11	85	4
Droids: Treasure of the Hidden Planet	United States/Canada	2004-11-23	88	4
Ewoks: The Haunted Village	United States/Canada	1997-02-11	75	4
Ewoks: Tales from the Endor Woods	United States/Canada	2004-11-23	75	4
Fantasia	United States	1940-11-13	124	7
Fantasia 2000	United States	1999-12-17	75	8
Fantastic Animation Festival	United States	1977-08-14	90	16-14
Fear(s) of the Dark; Peur(s) du noir	France	2007-10-21	85	5
Flavors of Youth	Japan/China	2018-08-04	76	3
FLUXimation	Japan	2005-09-20	?	14
Freudy Cat	United States	1964-03-14	7	3
From Tale to Tale; От сказки к сказке (Ot skazki k skazke)	USSR	1990-12-01	70	5
Fimfárum by Jan Werich	Czech Republic	2002-05-27	100	5
Fimfárum 2	Czech Republic	2006-02-23	90	4
Fun and Fancy Free	United States	1947-09-27	73	2
The Gate to the Mind's Eye	United States	1994-10-25	55	9
Garfield: His 9 Lives	United States	1988-11-22	60	9
Genius Party	Japan	2007-07-07	85	7
Genius Party Beyond	Japan	2008-10-11	85	5
Ghost Writers	United States	1958-04-28	7	3
Goofy's Guide to Success	United States	1990-11-18	87	17
Halo Legends	United States	2010-02-16	120	7
Hare-Abian Nights	United States	1959-02-28	7	3
Heathcliff: The Movie	France/United States/Canada	1986-01-17	70	7
Heavy Metal	Canada	1981-08-07	90	6
Heckle & Jeckle & Friends	United States	1986-XX-XX	60	8
A Herb Alpert and the Tijuana Brass Double Feature	United States	1966-04-XX	5	2
His Hare-Raising Tale	United States	1951-08-11	7	5
I'm in the Army Now	United States	1936-12-25	7	4
The Incredible Adventures of Wallace and Gromit	United Kingdom	2001-08-17	90	4
Incredible Manitoba Animation	Canada	1989-XX-XX	50	8
Interstella 5555: The 5tory of the 5ecret 5tar 5ystem インターステラ5555 (Intāsutera Fō Faibu)	France/Japan	2003-12-01	68	14
Ivan Tsarevitch and the Changing Princess; Ivan Tsarévitch et la Princesse Changeante	France	2016-09-28	53	4
Jerry's Diary	United States	1949-10-22	7	4
Jiminy Cricket: Storyteller	United States	1986-09-14	90	9
Kahlil Gibran's The Prophet	Canada	2014-9-6	84	8
Laugh It Up, Fuzzball: The Family Guy Trilogy	United States	2010-12-21	159	3
Life with Tom	United States	1953-11-21	8	3
Lifestyles of the Rich and Animated	United States	1991-09-18	90	11
The Looney Looney Looney Bugs Bunny Movie	United States	1981-11-20	79	12–15
Ludwig's Think Tank	United States	1985-09-01	90	6
Luminous Visions	United States	1998-12-25	45	?
Mach and Sebestova: Come Up to the Blackboard! Mach a Sebestová k tabuli!	Czechoslovakia	1985-01-01	71	7
Mafalda	Argentina	1981-12-03	82	?
Make Mine Music	United States	1946-04-20	75	10
The Many Adventures of Winnie the Pooh	United States	1977-03-11	74	3
Mario Kirby Masterpiece Video マリオ・カービィ 名作ビデオ (Mario Kābī Meisaku Bideo)	Japan	1994-XX-XX	18	2
Matinee Mouse	United States	1966-04-18	6	8
Melody Time	United States	1948-05-27	72	7
Memories	Japan	1995-12-23	113	3
The Mickey Mouse Anniversary Show	United States	1968-12-22	84	38
Mickey Mouse Disco	United States	1980-06-25	7	8
Mickey Mouse Jubilee Show	United States	1978-06-30	76	10
Mickey's Once Upon a Christmas	United States	1999-12-07	70	3
Mickey's Twice Upon a Christmas	United States	2004-11-09	68	5
Mighty Atom: The Brave in Space 鉄腕アトム 宇宙の勇者 (Tetsuwan Atomu: Uchū no yūsha)	Japan	1964-07-26	87	3
The Mind's Eye	United States	1990-01-01	40	?
Mucho Locos	United States	1966-02-04	7	5
Music Land	United States	1955-07-11	69	7
Neo Tokyo 迷宮物語 (Meikyū Monogatari)	Japan	1989-04-15	50	3
Not Ghoulty	United States	1959-05-07	7	2
Odyssey into the Mind's Eye	United States	1996-07-26	66	?
Old Czech Legends; Staré pověsti české	Czechoslovakia	1953-05-11	90	7
Optimus Mundus	Russia	2000-01-03	56	55
Outrageous Animation	United States	1989-01-01	82	22
Oggy and the Cockroaches: The Movie	France	2013-08-07	93	4
Le Petit Cirque et autres contes	France	1994-05-18	50	7
Popeye vs. the Red Indians; Braccio di Ferro contro gli indiani	United States/Italy	1978-12-23	80	12
Popeye's 20th Anniversary	United States	1954-04-02	7	2
Porky's Preview	United States	1941-04-19	7	6
Princes et Princesses	France	2000-1-26	70	6
The Puppetoon Movie	United States	1987-06-12	90	11
The Reluctant Dragon	United States	1941-06-20	72	4
Rolie Polie Olie: Olie's Winter Wonderland	United States	2003-11-04	56	7
Robot Carnival ロボット・カーニバル ( Robotto Kãnibaru)	Japan	1987-07-21	90	10
Rootin' Tootin' Roundup	United States	1990-09-03	73	12
The Roots of Goofy	United States	1984-08-02	90	17
Saludos Amigos	United States	1942-08-24	43	4
Sanrio Anime Festival サンリオアニメフェスティバル (Sanrio Anime Fesutibaru)	Japan	1989-07-22	?	3
Scooby-Doo! in Arabian Nights	United States	1994-09-03	69	2
Secrets of Fenville	United States	2003-11-20	112	9
Shutter Bugged Cat	United States	1967-07-16	7	6
Smarty Cat	United States	1955-10-14	7	3
Smitten Kitten	United States	1952-04-12	8	4
Spinach Packin' Popeye	United States	1944-07-21	7	2
Spinach vs Hamburgers	United States	1948-08-27	7	3
The Spirit of Mickey	United States	1998-07-14	83	11
Superstar Goofy	United States	1972-06-21	74	12
Sweat Punch スウェットパンチ (Suuettopanchi)	Japan	2007-01-25	52	5
Tales of 1001 Nights; Pohádky tisíce a jedné noci	Czechoslovakia	1974-12-03	88	7
Tales of the Night; Les Contes de la Nuit	France	2011-7-20	84	6
Tatsumi	Singapore	2011-5-17	98	5
This Is a Life?	United States	1955–07-09	7	3
Tiny Toy Stories	United States	1996-10-29	20	5
The Three Caballeros	United States	1944-12-21	72	7
The Many Adventures of Winnie the Pooh	United States	1977-2-11	74	3
Uncensored Cartoons	United States	1982-04-30	13	73
Uncle Grandpa: Guest Directed Shorts	United States	2015-05-21	11	3
Vacationing with Mickey and Friends	United States	1984-08-02	73	12
Virtual Nature: A Computer Generated Visual Odyssey	United States	1999-01-29	?	8
Walt Disney's 50th Anniversary Show	United States	1973-07-12	87	13
Walt Disney's Cartoon Carousel	United States	1975-08-29	70	12
Winnie the Pooh: Seasons of Giving	United States	1999-11-09	70	3
Winnie the Pooh: A Very Merry Pooh Year	United States	2002-11-12	60	2
Winter Days 冬の日 (Fuyu no Hi)	Japan	2003-06-19	40+65	36
Wubbzy's Big Movie!	United States	2008-08-29	77	?
Wubbzy's Big Movie II: Wubb Idol	United States	2009-04-27	44	9

== See also ==
- Lists of animated feature films
