= Mind Game (film) =

2004 film by Masaaki Yuasa

Japanese name
- Kana: マインド・ゲーム
Transcriptions
- Revised Hepburn: Maindo Gēmu
- Directed by: Masaaki Yuasa
- Written by: Masaaki Yuasa
- Based on: Mind Game by Robin Nishi
- Produced by: Eiko Tanaka
- Starring: Koji Imada; Sayaka Maeda; Takashi Fujii
- Edited by: Kyōko Mizuta
- Music by: Seiichi Yamamoto
- Production company: Studio 4°C
- Distributed by: Asmik Ace Entertainment
- Release date: August 7, 2004
- Running time: 103 minutes
- Country: Japan
- Language: Japanese

Mind Game (Japanese: マインド・ゲーム, Hepburn: Maindo Gēmu) is a 2004 Japanese adult-animated experimental comedy-drama film based on Robin Nishi's manga of the same name. It was planned, produced and primarily animated by Studio 4°C, and adapted and directed by Masaaki Yuasa in his directorial debut, with chief animation direction and model sheets by Yūichirō Sueyoshi, art direction by Tōru Hishiyama and groundwork and further animation direction by Masahiko Kubo.

It is unusual among features other than anthology films in using a series of disparate visual styles to tell one continuous story. As Yuasa commented in a Japan Times interview, "Instead of telling it serious and straight, I went for a look that was a bit wild and patchy. I think that Japanese animation fans today don't necessarily demand something that's so polished. You can throw different styles at them and they can still usually enjoy it."

The film was well received and has garnered a cult following, winning multiple awards worldwide, and has been praised by directors Satoshi Kon and Bill Plympton.

== Plot ==
Nishi is a 20-year-old NEET from Osaka with dreams of becoming a comic book artist. One evening, he runs into his childhood crush, Myon, on the subway. She takes him to her family's yakitori restaurant, where she introduces him to her father, her elder sister Yan, and her fiancé Ryo. Two yakuza, Atsu and a senior yakuza whom Atsu calls Aniki (literally 'brother', a term used by yakuza to refer to each other), enter looking for Myon's father, who had ostensibly seduced and stolen Atsu's girlfriend.

As Atsu threatens Myon at gunpoint, Ryo jumps to her defense, but Atsu knocks him unconscious. Atsu then prepares to rape Myon, who cries out for Nishi. Atsu turns on a terrified Nishi, placing his pistol against Nishi's anus and firing when Nishi finally musters the courage to yell out a threat, killing him instantly. The senior yakuza, offended by Atsu's lack of control, fatally shoots him.

Nishi is sentenced to a limbo where he is forced to watch his death over and over again. He then encounters Kami-sama (God), a being whose physical image changes every fraction of a second. Kami-sama beats and insults Nishi, claiming to have created him on a whim for his own entertainment. He then directs Nishi into a red portal where he will disappear, but at the last moment, Nishi declares he wants to return to life, and runs toward the opposite blue portal. Kami-sama, impressed by Nishi's sheer will to live, lets him escape.

Nishi returns to the moment just before Atsu pulled the trigger. This time, Nishi seizes Atsu's gun with his buttocks, and fatally shoots him. He, Yan and Myon all speed off in the yakuza's car, leaving the father and Ryo—still unconscious—behind. The yakuza follow them, threatening to frame them for armed robbery and murder. The boss has his men lead the trio to a dead end on a bridge, but Nishi steers the car off the bridge, and they are swallowed by an enormous whale.

Inside the whale, they meet an old man, who reveals he is a former yakuza who has been living inside the whale for more than 30 years. He shows them to the elaborate suspended house he has constructed over the 'sea' in the whale's belly. When Nishi's attempts to escape fail, the trio resign themselves to life inside the whale. Yan practices dancing and art, Myon practices swimming (a dream she gave up after reaching puberty), Nishi practices writing and drawing manga, and he and Myon finally become sexually intimate.

When the water level inside the whale begins rising, the old man explains that the whale is likely dying. They concoct a plan to make a motor boat using spare parts and fuel from the car they arrived in. On the day before the final match of the World Cup, the whale returns to Osaka and all four manage to escape.

As the four fly through the air, the film returns to its very first scene of Myon running from the yakuza, only this time her leg does not get caught in the door of the train, and the yakuza is left behind on the platform. This is followed by a lengthy montage, similar to that of the opening credits, showing the histories of the various characters. The phrase "This Story Has Never Ended" appears before the credits roll.

== Cast ==
Voice cast

- Koji Imada as Nishi
- Sayaka Maeda as Myon
- Takashi Fujii as Old Man (jiisan)
- Seiko Takuma as Yan
- Tomomitsu Yamaguchi as Ryō
- Toshio Sakata as Father of Myon and Yan (Myon to Yan no chichi)
- Jōji Shimaki as Yakuza Boss (yakuza no bosu)
- Ken'ichi Chūjō as Atsu (yakuza)
- Rintarō Nishi as Senior yakuza (Aniki. lit. "brother". A term used by yakuza to refer to each other).

Other crew

- Kōji Morimoto – animation director
- Shinichirō Watanabe – music producer

Production companies

- Studio 4°C
- Asmik Ace Entertainment
- Beyond C.
- Rentrack Japan Co. Ltd.

Other companies

- Gainax – animation
- Production I.G – animation

== Production ==
The proposal to adapt the manga Mind Game into a film came from Studio 4°C producer Eiko Tanaka. Kōji Morimoto, who belonged to the studio at the time, had originally discovered the manga and recommended it to studio staff and others around him. When Tanaka happened to pick it up, she decided, "We absolutely have to bring this to the screen ourselves". However, it became clear that adapting the manga into animation would present several challenges. For one, its artwork used extreme perspective to convey a vivid sense of movement, and it was difficult to persuade staff who did not understand the approach to embrace it. The manga also contained sex and violence, which were strictly off-limits in animation at the time, making financing difficult as well. Tanaka said they even considered incorporating live action so they could insist that "this is a live-action film ". Although the adaptation had been approved, no clear visual approach had emerged, and no one could think of a person capable of making it work as animation while preserving the manga's character. As everyone wrestled with the problem, Tanaka had a sudden conviction that "Masaaki Yuasa can do it" and decided to ask him to direct. Yuasa had never directed a feature film, but Tanaka felt that his innovative visual work on the family-oriented series Chibi Maruko-chan and Crayon Shin-chan made him a perfect fit. Yuasa had already been shown the manga by director Morimoto and animator Tatsuyuki Tanaka during production of Noiseman Sound Insect, and had been struck by its originality and the quality of its artistic execution. Eager to direct at the time, Yuasa thought, "This could turn into something interesting," and immediately accepted the offer. The Mind Game project was officially underway.

To capture the atmosphere of the original story, which is set in the streets of Osaka Prefecture, the production collaborated with Yoshimoto Kogyo, a company closely associated with Osaka, and many of its comedians took part. In addition to providing voice performances, they appeared in live-action footage of their faces, which was processed and used in the animation. Auditions were held on Yomiuri TV's Pro no Dōmyaku, a program featuring Yoshimoto comedians. Voice actress Sayaka Maeda was chosen to play the heroine, Myon, while Yoshimoto actress Seiko Takuma was cast as Myon's older sister, Yan.

The film uses a technique in which live-action footage is occasionally inserted abruptly into the animation: characters' appearances are replaced with the actual faces of the performers voicing them, while distinctive perspectives based on live-action footage heighten the psychological portrayal. The process began, as in traditional animation, with hand-drawn layouts by animators to establish the shapes and positions of the backgrounds, characters, and objects. Next, the painted backgrounds were scanned and applied to 3D objects. Once the individual elements were complete, they were combined with live-action footage in 3ds Max to create 3D computer animation. The footage was then edited and effects (special effects) were added in Adobe After Effects to finish the animation. At Yuasa's request, particular care was taken to keep the film from looking too much like CGI and to preserve a hand-drawn feel. For the live-action footage, the production brought in the crew of Tetsuya Nakashima, who had earned acclaim for his commercial work at the time—afterward, Studio 4°C produced the animated segments of Nakashima's film Kamikaze Girls.

The score was composed by Seiichi Yamamoto, known for his work across multiple artistic disciplines. Pieces were created in a range of genres, including rock and bossa nova. Shinichirō Watanabe, who had worked on Cowboy Bebop and The Animatrix, served as producer. In addition to Yamamoto, Watanabe brought in composer Yoko Kanno, who contributed a solo piano performance of Hungarian Rhapsody No. 2 in C♯ minor. Fayray provided the image song for the film.

The film took about two years to complete. However, it could not be released without approval from Eirin, so Tanaka initially expected it to receive an R18+ rating. When it was shown to Eirin's reviewers, however, they responded far more favorably than expected, and it was ultimately released without any age restriction. Tanaka said this also gave her confidence in the film.

== Release ==
The Japanese DVD release of the film includes English subtitles on the feature itself. In 2008, Madman Entertainment in Australia released the film on Region 4 DVD. According to Tekkonkinkreet director Michael Arias, there was consideration for a release of the film on R1 DVD but it fell through. In 2017, GKIDS announced that they licensed the film, which streamed on VRV Select on December 29 of that year, followed by a limited theatrical run in February 2018 and a home video release on August 28 of that year. On April Fool's Day in 2018, the movie aired on Adult Swim's Toonami block with Japanese audio and English subtitles.

== Reception and legacy ==
The film has a 100% rating on Rotten Tomatoes, based on 14 reviews. Metacritic, which uses a weighted average, assigned the film a score of 66 out of 100, based on 6 critics, indicating "generally favorable" reviews. The film's accolades include the Ōfuji Noburō Award at the 2005 Mainichi Film Awards and the Animation Division Grand Prize at the Japan Media Arts Festival in 2004, outranking nominee Howl's Moving Castle. Outside Japan, the film had its international premiere at the New York Asian Film Festival in June 2005. It had possibly its biggest success at the Fantasia Festival in Canada in July 2005, wherein it beat many live-action films to win all three of the festival's own jury awards it qualified for: Best Film, Best Director (tying with Gen Sekiguchi for Survive Style 5+) and Best Script. It also received an additional Special Award for "Visual Accomplishment", as well as placing first (Golden Prize) in the audience award for Best Animation Film and second (Silver Prize), behind Survive Style 5+, for Most Groundbreaking Film.

Legacy

Filmmaking duo Daniel Kwan and Daniel Scheinert have cited Mind Game as a influence for their 2022 comedy Everything Everywhere All at Once, which was met with widespread acclaim and would be nominated for eleven awards and won seven at the 95th Academy Awards, including Best Original Screenplay, Best Director and Best Picture.
