= Osamu Kobayashi (illustrator) =

Japanese animator (1964–2021)

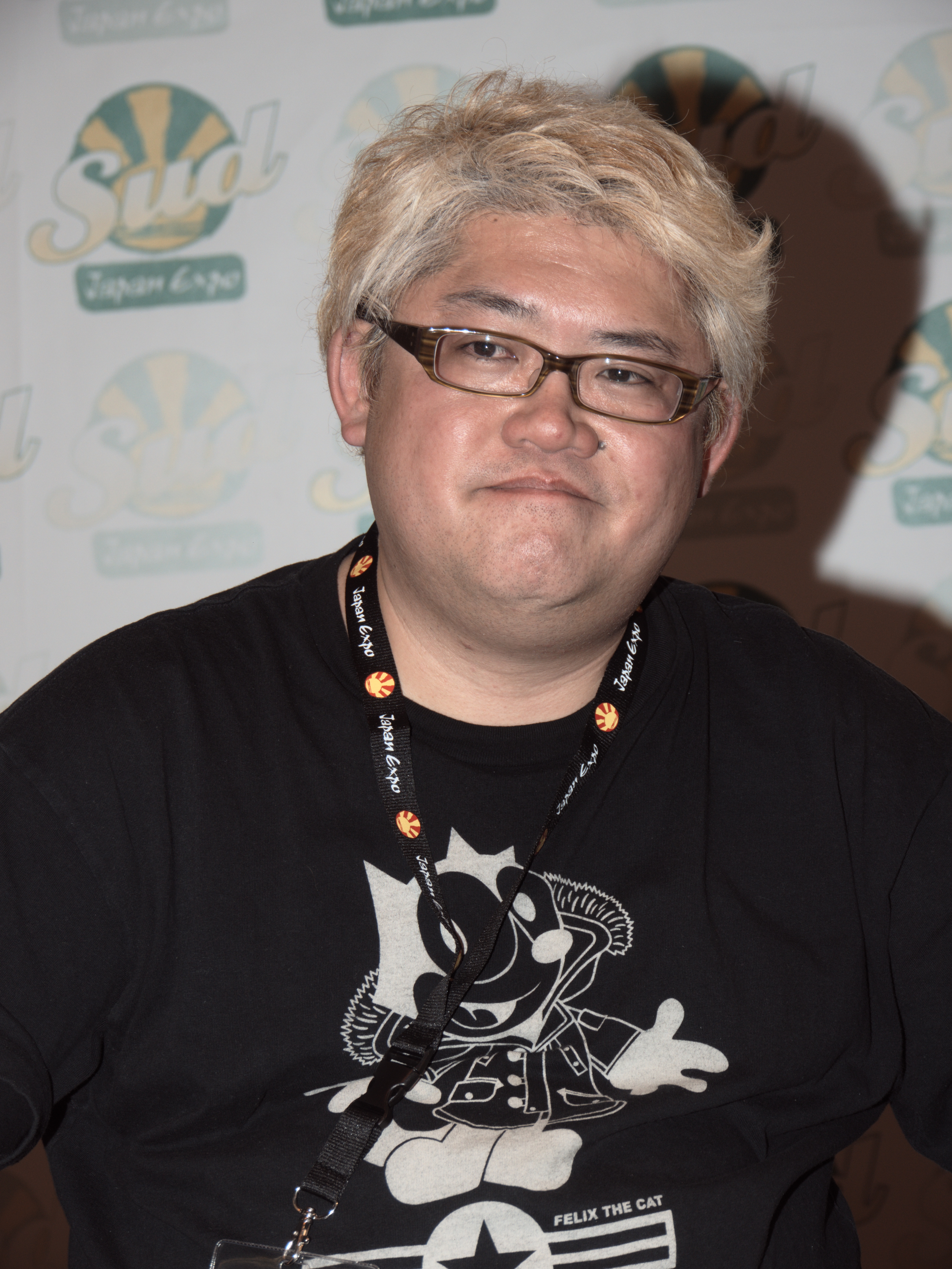
Osamu Kobayashi at the Japan Expo Sud 2011 in Marseille

Osamu Kobayashi (小林 治, Kobayashi Osamu) (January 10, 1964 – April 17, 2021) was a Japanese animator, illustrator, mechanical designer, and animation director primarily known for BECK: Mongolian Chop Squad and Paradise Kiss; his guest appearance as director of episode 4 of Gurren Lagann, and, most recently, episode 15 of Dororo. After graduating from high school, he worked as a designer and manga artist, but following his participation in Grandia he was mainly active in the field of animation. He originally directed avant-garde shorts and music videos for Studio 4°C and has more recently done two TV series for Madhouse Studios. Kobayashi was diagnosed with kidney cancer in 2019, and died on April 17, 2021, at 57 years old, from a colon infection caused by the disease. His name is occasionally rendered in full katakana to differentiate from Osamu Kobayashi, an unrelated anime episode director.

== Filmography ==
=== Director ===
- table&fishman (short) (2002) (first directorial work)
- End of the world (short - part of Grasshoppa! series) (2002)
- Beck: Mongolian Chop Squad (TV) (2004–2005)
- Paradise Kiss (TV) (2005)
- Sancha (The Aromatic Tea) Blues (short) (2007)
- Someday's Dreamers: Summer Skies (TV) (2008)
- Sonny Angel (PV) (2012)
- Naruto: Shippuden (TV) (2016) (eps 480–483)
- Rinshi! Ekoda-chan (TV) (2019) (ep 11)

=== Other ===
- Venus Wars (Movie) (1989) - Mecha cleanup
- Grandia (Game) (1997) - World setting design
- Blue Submarine No. 6 (OVA) (1998) - Art design, art setting
- Evolution: The World of Sacred Device (Game) (1999) - World setting design, mechanical design, demo director
- Gungrave (Game) (2002) - Art design, mechanical design, stage concept design
- Gad Guard (TV) (2003) - Set design, original drawing animation director, storyboard, episode director, key animation, ending animation
- Kaiketsu Zorori (TV) (2004) - Ending animation
- Zoids: Genesis (TV) (2005–2006) - Digald concept design
- Kemonozume (TV) (2006) - Storyboard, episode director, animation director, key animation (ep 7)
- Gurren Lagann (TV) (2008) - Storyboard, episode director, animation director, key animation (ep 4)
- Hanamaru Kindergarten (TV) (2010) - ED animation special director, animation director (ep 7)
- Panty & Stocking with Garterbelt (TV) (2010) - Setting, episode director, storyboard, key animation (ep 5b)
- Tegami Bachi REVERSE (TV) (2010) - ED2 illustration
- The Mystic Archives of Dantalian (TV) (2011) - Storyboard, episode director (ep 9)
- One Night City (Manga) (2014)
- The Last: Naruto the Movie (Movie) (2014) - Concept art
- Garo: Crimson Moon (TV) (2014) - Storyboard (ep 4)
- Lupin the 3rd Part IV: The Italian Adventure (TV) (2015) - Storyboard, episode director (ep 12)
- Dororo (TV) (2019) - Storyboard and episode director (ep 15), ending animation
