= Genius Party =

2007 anthology of short animated films

- Genius Party DVD cover
- Directed by: Atsuko Fukushima (#1); Shōji Kawamori (#2); Shinji Kimura (#3); Yōji Fukuyama (#4); Hideki Nimura (#5); Masaaki Yuasa (#6); Shinichirō Watanabe (#7)
- Written by: Atsuko Fukushima (#1); Shōji Kawamori (#2); Mitsuyoshi Takasu (#3); Yōji Fukuyama (#4); Hideki Nimura (#5); Masaaki Yuasa (#6); Shinichirō Watanabe (#7)
- Produced by: Yukie Saeki
- Starring: Tomoko Kaneda; Rinko Kikuchi; Lu Ningjuan; Taro Yabe; Yūya Yagira
- Music by: Kaoru Inoue (#1); Akio Izutsu (#2); Toshio Nakagawa (#2); Seiichi Yamamoto (#3); Takuma Watanabe(#4); Fennesz (#5); Nobukazu Takemura (#6); Yoko Kanno (#7)
- Production company: Studio 4°C
- Release date: July 7, 2007
- Running time: 85 minutes
- Country: Japan
- Language: Japanese

Genius Party (Japanese: ジーニアス・パーティ, Hepburn: Jīniasu Pāti) are two anthology films made up of 12 short animated films from Studio 4°C. It was envisioned to form a single release.

== Releases ==
The first volume, containing seven shorts and entitled Genius Party, was released on July 7, 2007. The second volume, containing five shorts and titled Genius Party Beyond, was released on February 15, 2008. Each short in the anthology has a distinctive animation style and unique story from the directors including Masaaki Yuasa, Shōji Kawamori, Shinichirō Watanabe, and Mahiro Maeda. GKIDS and Shout Factory released both volumes on Blu-ray on October 15, 2019.

== Genius Party ==
=== Genius Party ===
Directed by Atsuko Fukushima

In a barren desert, a man in a strange bird costume encounters a group of egg-like stones that burrow into the ground. One stone produces a heart after stopping to admire a flower and the bird-man eats the heart; producing glowing wings and flying into the sky. The stone awakens when it begins to rain and creates another heart just as its fellow stones come out of the ground. It then produces a large glowing flower that transcends into the sky and imbues the stone with powers that electrify the other stones. They create a giant pulsating brain in the ground (showcasing the title of the film) before panning out to reveal the bird-man again, who is standing in front of what appears to be a hive with the stones coming out of it.

=== Shanghai Dragon ===
Directed by Shōji Kawamori

In China, a young boy who likes to draw named Gonglong is picked on by bullies with a girl named Meihua defending him. Suddenly, a glowing pen falls out of the sky and lands in front of the school. Gonglong picks it up and uses it to draw food which becomes real and allows him to eat it. It quickly becomes apparent that he is the only one who can use it. Giant alien robots suddenly attack the city, but Gonglong and Meihua are protected by two agents from the future; a human named Chase and a cyborg named Sai. Upon seeing Gonglong's capabilities of using the pen, they try to protect him and Meihua. After Sai is blown up and left with simply his head, Gonglong draws a superhero costume for himself and battles the robots; destroying many in the process. However, he is unable to blow up the mother ship and Chase forces him to draw a missile to destroy it; saving the city, but making Gonglong cry due to his harshness. Chase reveals that 300 years in the future humans cannot have children anymore and they came back to learn from the imagination of children. Empowered, Gonglong draws a glowing dragon and a new body for Sai as the four of them rebuild the city before flying off into space.

=== Deathtic 4 ===
Directed by Shinji Kimura

In a world populated by zombies, Rått prepares to go to school when he discovers a frog. As living things are prohibited in this world, Rått takes it upon himself to hide it from everyone. He befriends a student at his school named Plåsse who wears a bag over his head and claims to be a superhero with super strength. He is accompanied by Plåsse, a boy who spits water, and Ashe, a boy who can set himself on fire. Rått shows the frog to them and asks that they help him with getting it to an "Uzu Uzu", a giant tornado with a glowing hole at the top. They run afoul of the zombie police who want the frog, but after a long chase, they make it to the Uzu Uzu and release the frog; its fate is unknown.

=== Doorbell ===
Directed by Yoji Fukuyama

A little girl with her mother looks at a young man and thinks she sees two of them. The young man comes home, only to find that there is another one of him there and that he is invisible to everyone. The doubles, who ambiguously seem to acknowledge his existence, continue to arrive at places before him, resulting in him becoming invisible to others, yet occasionally can be seen by people. He finally goes to see his girlfriend and makes it before his scheduled time and calls for her to come down from her apartment. As she does so, he sees in the reflection of the door another double and turns to toss his bag at it. His girlfriend is confused by his action but admits that she thought she saw another him. The young man admits that it was his "old self" and that he is happy that she is seeing him now. After a short chat, he goes up to her apartment and smiles at his double watching him from outside.

=== Limit Cycle ===
Directed by Hideki Futamura

In this plotless segment, a salaryman, seemingly trapped in an endless cycle of work, makes an existential examination of the world. Illustrated in the manner of a psychedelic hallucination.

=== Happy Machine ===
Directed by Masaaki Yuasa

An infant lives in a bright colorful nursery that caters to his every whim, only for it to suddenly break down; revealing a stoic and lifeless room. The floor gives way and the baby finds himself underneath a strange structure with legs containing holes in the shape of people. The baby examines his surroundings and finds his bottle, but encounters a small fire being that begins to eat everything he owns and chases him. Soon, giant water droplets full of small fish creatures fall from the sky and the baby finds sanctuary from the fire creature, though he cries afterward when the fire creature dies from getting too close to the water. The baby then meets a tall awkward creature to ride and a green plant creature that eats the baby's urine and feces to produce plants. The tall creature is swallowed by a hole while the green plant turns into a glowing seed and gets eaten by a giant flower creature, despite the baby's efforts to rescue him. Years later, the baby, now a full-grown and bearded man with prosthetic limbs, finds himself back at the structure and enters it to find another baby. He leaves some mementos and feeds her before going back down to the legs and entering the hole. This apparently jumpstarts the nursery's functions as it springs to life for the new baby. The segment ends with the phrase to be continued...

=== Baby Blue ===
Directed by Shinichirō Watanabe

High school student Sho approaches his childhood friend Hazuki about skipping school and she surprisingly agrees. When they were children, they broke into a warehouse and found a box of grenades; taking one as a souvenir. Sho reveals that he plans to bury it with her while going to the beach. They take a train, but fall asleep and miss their stop. They steal a bike and outrun a cop, before getting stopped by a street gang. Sho uses the grenade to blow up one of the gang leader's cars, and the two flee before finally making it to the beach at sunrise. They try and fail to set off firecrackers. Sho reveals that he is moving away and wanted to have one last time with Hazuki whom he is aware already has a boyfriend. She admits that she looked up to and had a crush on him, but promises to remember him. As Sho and his mother leave to move away, Sho looks out the window of the train and sees Hazuki setting off the firecrackers from the beach, successfully this time.

=== Voice cast ===
- Tomoko Kaneda
- Rinko Kikuchi
- Lu Ningjuan
- Taro Yabe
- Yûya Yagira
- Yoko Kanno

== Genius Party Beyond ==
Genius Party Beyond
- Directed by: Mahiro Maeda (#1); Kazuto Nakazawa (#2); Shinya Ōhira (#3); Tatsuyuki Tanaka (#4); Kōji Morimoto (#5)
- Written by: Mahiro Maeda (#1); Kazuto Nakazawa (#2); Shinya Ōhira (#3); Tatsuyuki Tanaka (#4); Kōji Morimoto (#5)
- Produced by: Hiroto Yonemori (#1); Kunitoshi Yamada (#2); Yukie Saeki (#3); Eiko Tanaka (#4); Rika Hatakeda (#5)
- Starring: Arata Furuta; Akiko Suzuki; Shōko Takada; Urara Takano
- Music by: Akira Ifukube (#1); Warsaw Village Band (#2); Minami Nozaki (#3); Juno Reactor (#5)
- Production company: Studio 4°C
- Release date: October 11, 2008
- Running time: 85 minutes
- Country: Japan
- Language: Japanese

=== Gala ===
Directed by Mahiro Maeda

In a forested village of yōkai, a giant seed crash lands nearby. The villagers all angrily attack it, but a young oni named Co-oni begins to hear strange noises emanating from it. He is called upon by elder Jii who summons a harpy girl and a giant cat to help fulfill the purpose of the seed. Riding atop giant instruments, the three of them proceed to play music to awaken the seed as it cracks open to reveal a giant bud. Soon, the other villagers join in by playing their own instruments as Jii turns into a wooden idol and leaves the rest up to his progeny. Co-oni stands atop the bud as it continues to grow higher and higher towards a bright light in the clouds. It is revealed that the plant is actually quite small and is growing from a potted plant on the balcony of a Japanese apartment complex. A small boy notices that it is growing and alerts his mother about it.

=== Moondrive ===
Directed by Kazuto Nakazawa

Four inept criminals, Zico, Pekepeke, Yuki, and Mikishi, hear a word of a treasure located somewhere on Giant Island. They manage to acquire a map from an item collector, by allowing him to have sex with Pekepeke for an hour, and then have the map translated, again with the same offer, only to learn that it is in plain English and that it is a map to another treasure map. They realize that they need to get a rocket, but do not have enough money, so they go challenge a crime boss to a game of pool for all the money: should they lose, he will get two hours with Pekepeke, who is too tired to have sex. Zico actually manages to do well, but a comically unfortunate bungle with the last ball results in them losing all their money. The gang decides to just simply steal a rocket, but it runs out of gas and they crash. They realize that they can just simply get a ticket to Giant Island and steal a ship to crash into a dormant volcano that simply uses a fog machine to simulate fake lava. Upon entering, they find the second map and learn, to Zico's comical anger, that both maps are simply tourist guide maps with one being an updated version of it. Zico angrily blows up the whole island, yet despite this, optimistically suggests that they go on to their next adventure. The whole segment is revealed to be a stage show.

=== 'Wanwa' the Doggy ===
Directed by Shinya Ōhira

A young boy plays in the hospital room of his mother who is about to have a baby. After the father dejectedly leaves, the room suddenly breaks apart and an ogre kidnaps the boy's mom. The boy suddenly finds himself in a fantastical and chaotic world where he does battle with a giant red ogre, gets saved by a dog (the titular Wanwa), drives a rocket car, and runs up a tree. The boy encounters Wanwa and believes that he is asleep, only to realize that he is dead. As the boy cries over the dog, more ogres arrive to attack the boy, but the positive vibes of his mother defeats the ogres. The whole adventure is revealed to be a dream, as the boy awakens to the vagitus of his newborn sibling and his father cries tears of joy. The boy looks out the window to see a stuffed Wanwa in a tree while a man in a trench coat arrives to leave flowers over a manhole cover of a dog. When the end title pops up, the trench coat man is shocked that the short is over and is seen removing his outfit in a changing room.

=== Toujin Kit ===
Directed by Tatsuyuki Tanaka

In a steampunk world, a young woman illegally creates alien life forms inside stuffed animals. She spends the rest of her days sitting and watching TV and eating snacks. One day, the authorities arrive at her apartment and discover her activities. The woman picks up a stuffed frog and flees while the Captain finds a "Tou Bug" in her apartment and the source of the aliens. He pours a powder over them and they poof from existence. The woman continues to run, but trips down a flight of stone steps and hurts her ankle while dropping the frog doll. The authorities arrive and a giant alien creature emerges from the doll. Just before it does anything, a train hits and kills it; causing a chain reaction that kills the other aliens in the woman's apartment. The authorities prepare to take her away as the short abruptly ends.

=== Dimension Bomb ===
Directed by Kōji Morimoto

In what appears to be another dimension close to, yet different from ours, a young boy in a strange hood and helmet wanders a road where two gang bangers pull over and, presumably, beat him up. The boy, named Shin, meets an eccentric girl who says "Cheese!" all the time. The two of them become friends. Later, something inexplicable happens that results in the boy shedding his helmet and hood and appearing as a pale white figure with red markings. He explodes into a fiery being before reverting to a regular-looking boy. The rest of the segment is interspersed with strange visuals both pertaining to Shin's relationship with the girl and those having to do with establishing the world. This all culminates in Shin coming back to a moment in which he fell off his bike on the street; apparently back in the real world. He continues to ride his bike and falls off yet again, this time shouting into the distance as a way to remember the strange girl.

=== Voice cast ===
- Arata Furuta
- Akiko Suzuki
- Shôko Takada
- Urara Takano

== Reception ==
The Encyclopedia of Science Fiction described Genius Party as a varied and solid anthology of animated short films, finding most of its segments interesting and enjoyable. It singled out Deathtic 4 as the collection's strongest contribution, praising its imaginative and eccentric approach, while also commending the animation of the opening segment, Genius Party. However, it criticized Limit Cycle as pretentious and excessively long, despite acknowledging its occasional visual merits. Overall, the encyclopedia regarded the anthology favorably, although it considered its successor, Genius Party Beyond, a substantially stronger collection, despite containing fewer films and having a shorter overall running time. Although it regarded the opening segments of Beyond, Gala and Moondrive, as good, it particularly praised the final three shorts—"Wanwa" the Doggy, Toujin Kit and Dimension Bomb—as remarkable achievements in animation, distinguished by their contrasting visual styles and tones. However, it observed that their strengths lay primarily in visual experimentation rather than storytelling, warning that viewers seeking coherent and complete narratives might be disappointed.

== See also ==
- List of animated package films
- Ani*Kuri15
- Japan Animator Expo
- Robot Carnival - Anthology anime film from 1987.
- Young Animator Training Project
