= Comedy (2002 film) =

2002 short anime film

喜劇 (Kigeki)
- Original video animation
- Directed by: Kazuto Nakazawa
- Studio: Studio 4°C
- Released: February 5, 2002
- Runtime: 11 minutes

Comedy (喜劇, Kigeki) is a short anime film produced in 2002 by Studio 4°C animation studio. The film was directed by Kazuto Nakazawa and featured the music of Franz Schubert's "Ave Maria". The film is noted for drawing its inspiration from Schubert's piece titled "Erlkönig".

== Plot ==
During the Irish War of Independence, a five-year-old girl went out in search of the mysterious Demon's Castle. She hoped to recruit the services of the infamous Black Swordsman, who was portrayed as a dark, albeit skilled, swordsman. She wanted the swordsman to protect her village from an imminent attack by English soldiers; however, the Black Swordsman would only accept a particular genre of books as payment for his services. Upon receiving the book, the swordsman immersed himself in reading the novel, the cover of which shows that its title is "Denny's comedy". The second night in the castle, while reading the book on top of a tree, was the only time that the girl saw him smiling. While she anxiously waited for the Black Swordsman to finish the novel, the English approached the Irish village. As an attack was imminent, the Black Swordsman finished the novel and rushed to intercept the raid and quickly finished off the English soldiers. The bodies disappeared; the girl knew where to, but the swordsman told her not to not tell anybody about it, nor the way he smiled while reading the novel, or he would kill her and devour her. As he's about to leave the village, the girl runs to him to thank him. When turning to her, it is shown that the Swordsman has red stains on the lower part of his face and his neck.

== Production ==
This short film was produced and bundled on the Studio 4°C Region 2 release of Deep Imagination which is a DVD of 5 short OVA films. This DVD is a collection of films under the Sweat Punch series label by Studio 4°C.

The film uses two pieces of music, both originally composed by Franz Peter Schubert: "Ave Maria" and "Erlkönig".
