= Black Swordsman =

Black Swordsman may refer to:

- Guts (Berserk), the protagonist of the manga series Berserk
- Black Swordsman, a character in the film Comedy
- Kirito (Sword Art Online), the protagonist of the light novel series Sword Art Online
- Gabriel, a character in the video game Summon Night: Swordcraft Story 2
- Reaper, the titular protagonist of the video game Reaper: Tale of a Pale Swordsman
- "The Black Swordsman", a song by Battle Beast from the 2015 album Unholy Savior
