= First Squad =

2009 film directed by Yoshiharu Ashino

First Squad: The Moment of Truth
- Kana: ファースト・スクワッド
- Directed by: Yoshiharu Ashino
- Written by: Aljosha Klimov; Misha Shprits
- Produced by: Eiko Tanaka; Aljosha Klimov; Misha Shprits
- Starring: Elena Chebaturkina; Michael Tikhonov; Ludmila Shuvalova; Damir Eldarov; Irina Savina; Aleksandr Gruzdev; Sergei Aisman
- Cinematography: João da Costa Pinto; Sergey Akimov; Kumiko Sakamoto
- Music by: DJ Krush; The 3ug3reeder
- Production companies: Studio 4°C; Molot Entertainment Film Company
- Distributed by: Molot Entertainment Film Company
- Release dates: May 13, 2009 (Cannes); October 15, 2009 (Russia)
- Running time: 73 minutes
- Countries: Russia; Japan
- Language: Russian
- Box office: $ 292 377

First Squad: The Moment of Truth (Japanese: ファーストスクワッド Fāsuto sukuwaddo, Russian: Пе́рвый отря́д, romanized: Perviy otryad) is a Russian-Japanese animated film directed by Yoshiharu Ashino. The film is a joint animation project of Japan's Studio 4°C and Russia's Molot Entertainment. It won the Kommersant newspaper's prize.

== Plot ==
Set during the opening days of World War II on the Eastern Front (autumn and winter of 1941/1942). Its main cast are a group of Soviet teenagers with extraordinary abilities; the teenagers have been drafted to form a special unit to fight the invading German army. They are opposed by a Schutzstaffel (SS) officer who is attempting to raise from the dead a supernatural army of crusaders from the 12th-century Order of the Sacred Cross (i.e. the Teutonic Knights) and enlist them in the Nazi cause.

Most of the teenage crew die, except for the protagonist Nadya. She is taken to a secret Soviet lab that studies supernatural phenomena, especially contacts with the dead. Nadya's task is to dive into the world of the dead for reconnaissance. There, in the Gloomy Valley, she meets her dead friends and persuades them to continue fighting.

== Voice Cast ==
Character	Russian voice actor	English voice actor
Nadya	Elena Chebaturkina	Cassandra Lee Morris
Leo	Michael Tikhonov	Joey Morris
Zena	Ludmila Shuvalova	Carrie Keranen
Marat	Damir Eldarov	Tony Oliver
Valya	Irina Savina	Bryce Papenbrook
General Below	Aleksandr Gruzdev	Michael McConnohie
Baron Von Wolff	Sergei Aisman	Phineas

== History ==
The film is an adaptation of a music video for the song "Наша с тобой победа" ("Our victory") by Russian rap artist Ligalize, which was released on May 9, 2005. The video, which depicted a battle between the Soviet Pioneers and Nazi armies, was directed by Daisuke Nakayama, and produced by Aljosha Klimov and Misha Shprits. The Nazis are shown to be in possession of mecha and various supernatural powers. Among the featured locations are the Palace of the Soviets and Mayakovskaya metro station, Moscow. In 2006, the video won an award at the MTV Russian Music Awards for best hip-hop video.

When it was released at feature-length in 2009, the film (whose expanded title is "First Squad: the Moment of Truth") was the winner of the Kommerstandt Weekend Prize at the Moscow International Film Festival, as well as the Asteroide Award at the Trieste Science+Fiction Festival in Italy.

The film was also adapted as a graphic novel of the same name, by creators Aljosha Klimov and Misha Shprits, alongside the acclaimed manga artist Enka Sugihara. It was published in October 2020 by eigoMANGA.

== Production ==
In 2007, it was announced that a motion picture titled First Squad: The Moment of Truth was in the works. Film is produced by Studio 4°C and recently created for this purpose studio Molot Entertainment, distributed by Amedia. Directed by Studio 4 °C director and animator Yoshiharu Ashino, cowritten and produced by Aljosha Klimov, Misha Shprits, with Eiko Tanaka, featuring character development by Hirofumi Nakata, and music by Japanese musician DJ Krush.

== Release ==
The film has been shown at Cannes Film Festival, Locarno Film Festival, Fantasporto and Fantasia film festival.

The film was released in North America on Blu-Ray and DVD by Anchor Bay Entertainment on January 17, 2012.
