= Eternal Family =

Japanese original video animation

永久家族 (Eikyuu Kazoku)
- Genre: Adventures, Psychological, Simulated reality, Surreal comedy
- Original video animation
- Directed by: Koji Morimoto
- Studio: Studio 4°C
- Released: April 1997 – March 1998
- Runtime: 30 seconds each
- Episodes: 53

Eternal Family (永久家族, Eikyuu Kazoku) is a 1997 OVA directed by Koji Morimoto and released by Japanese animation studio, Studio 4°C. The film is about the daily life of a group of six very different strangers who, for scientific purposes, are brainwashed into believing that they are a family. The family is filmed and to recoup scientific expenses the distribution rights for the footage are sold to a television station for broadcast as a domestic soap opera called Eternal Family. The show becomes highly popular in the outside world so when a plumbing disaster results in the family accidentally escaping, the television station and the residents of Champon City spare no expense to retrieve them.

The story was written jointly by Morimoto and Dai Sato. Eternal Family represents Sato's debut as an anime screenwriter, and Morimoto's first foray into the field of broadcast media. In 2004 the OVA was collected for release on one DVD.

== Plot ==
The storyline follows an actor named Ben and a group of six unrelated men and women who have been implanted with false memories that they are his family. They live together in a capsule with a pet dog and chicken and apart from Ben, none of them know anything about the outside world. The outside world, however, is intimately acquainted with their lives, as the artificial drama is broadcast live as a real-life soap opera in the simulated community of Champon City.

After the show has become popular, a plumbing disaster occurs that shatters the capsule and sends the family out into the real world, which they explore as the world around them searches for them in order to return them to the show. With the use of high-tech equipment and with a reward of ¥2 million for the return of each member, the family is soon rounded up and returned to a new capsule where they are again brainwashed.

== Cast ==
- Ben Hanada (Masashi Hirose) - The patriarch of the family. He is the only member of the family who has not been brainwashed and who knows that the family is being broadcast on television. He carries a blow-up doll that serves to hold a hidden camera for the TV station.
- Akiko (Yūko Mizutani) - The eldest daughter. Highly given to dramatics, Akiko is a pyromaniac in search of her "darling" (presumably her ex-husband).
- Tamasaburo - The family dog. Endowed with copious amounts of hair, Tamasaburo's explosive bark is much worse than his bite.
- Michael (Wasabi Mizuta) - The baby of the family. Michael is given to animal cruelty and enjoys being cold. He plays with scissors and often cuts people's pants off.
- Sasuke Tamasaburou (Kappei Yamaguchi) - The eldest son. Extremely violent, Sasuke owns a machine gun that he often fires indiscriminately. He enjoys spray painting graffiti and huffing paint fumes.
- A-ko (Ako Mayama under the pseudonym Lin Suwon) - The mother of the family and Ben's wife. A-ko is frequently constipated. She loves the stars although she never has an opportunity to see them.
- Sae (Tie Kumashiro) - The youngest daughter. Sae is very introverted and withdrawn. She speaks through the use of a hand puppet with whom she often argues.
- Chicken - An offering of live food that arrives from the food dispenser for the family to eat. The family instead adopts it as a pet. The chicken often wears clothing because Michael had cut and plucked off most of its feathers.
- Xavier (Ken'ichi Ogata) - The head of the television station. Dressed as St. Francisco de Xavier (just as all other members of the TV station), Xavier was the one who hired Ben. It is Xavier's job to head the round-up effort when the eternal family escapes.

== Staff ==
- Director, character design, setting/world view: Koji Morimoto
- Series content: Shinichi Matsumi
- Writer: Koji Morimoto, Sato Hiroshi
- Animation director: Takamitsu Kondou
- Art director: Hiroshi Katou
- Director: Kusumi Naoko
- Producer: Eiko Tanaka
- Animation Production: Studio 4°C
