= Tweeny Witches =

Japanese anime television series

- Cover of the first DVD volume

魔法少女隊アルス (Mahō Shōjotai Arusu)
- Genre: Comedy; Dark fantasy; Magical girl
- Created by: Keita Amemiya
- Anime television series
- Directed by: Yoshiharu Ashino
- Produced by: Wataru Tanaka; Rika Tsurusaki; Shinjirō Yokoyama; Hiroyuki Hattori; Shinsaku Tanaka
- Written by: Shinji Obara
- Music by: Tamiya Terashima
- Studio: Studio 4°C
- Licensed by: US: AnimeWorks
- Original network: NHK Educational TV
- Original run: April 9, 2004 – March 4, 2005
- Episodes: 40
- Original video animation

Tweeny Witches: The Adventures
- Directed by: Yoshiharu Ashino
- Produced by: Wataru Tanaka; Rika Tsurusaki; Shinjirō Yokoyama; Hiroyuki Hattori; Shinsaku Tanaka
- Written by: Sunao Katabuchi; Yūko Kawabe; Eiko Tanaka
- Music by: Tamiya Terashima
- Studio: Studio 4°C
- Licensed by: US: AnimeWorks
- Released: November 22, 2007
- Runtime: 23 minutes
- Episodes: 6
- icon

Tweeny Witches (Japanese: 魔法少女隊アルス, Hepburn: Mahō Shōjo Tai Arusu; lit. 'Magical Girl Squad Arusu') is a Japanese anime television and original video animation series. Produced by Studio 4°C, the series is directed by Yoshiharu Ashino and written by Shinji Obara. Inspired by Through the Looking-Glass, the story follows a young human girl who finds herself trapped in a magical world filled with witches, warlocks, and fairies. In 2003, it was announced at the Tokyo International Anime Fair that the anime Magical Girl Squad Arusu was going to be made. The series first aired between April 9, 2004, and March 4, 2005; in all, 40 episodes were made plus an OVA that contains 6 episodes which were released in 2007.

It was translated and dubbed into English by the anime television network Animax, who broadcast it in its respective networks in Southeast Asia and other regions, and was licensed for distribution in the United States by Media Blasters until 2012. AnimeWorks (later called Media Blasters) licensed under the English name Tweeny Witches with three DVDs being released in 2008. The OVA titled Tweeny Witches: The Adventures (魔法少女隊アルス The Adventure, Mahō Shōjo Tai Arusu: Ji Adobenchā; lit. 'Magical Girl Squad Arusu: The Adventure') was also released on DVD by Media Blasters in 2009.

== Plot ==
Over fourteen years prior to the main events, a Japanese archaeologist named Jidan discovers the Crow Statue within the ruins of Crow Island and accidentally falls into the Magical Realm. There, he is captured and imprisoned by Grande, the ruler of the warlocks. A witch soldier named Atelia rescues him, and the two later have a son named Lennon. To prevent the dark magic within the True Book of Spells from corrupting the Human Realm, Jidan leaves Atelia to seal the book away. During his return journey, he becomes separated from Lennon, who grows up to become a pirate on the Interdimensional Sea. Jidan later marries Yoko, and they have a daughter named Arusu. He teaches Arusu to believe in magic and gifts her the True Book of Spells on her fifth birthday before departing once more to search for Lennon. Instead, he is imprisoned for six years in Wizard Kingdom, the capital of the Warlock Realm.

In the present, eleven-year-old Arusu is summoned to the Magical Realm by Lennon and the True Book of Spells. She is captured by witches alongside a mina fairy but is freed by Eva, a young witch grateful for Arusu's kindness. Though thrilled to be in a world of magic, Arusu disagrees with the witches' exploitation of fairies as sources of power. After releasing the captive fairies, she is tasked with lifting the Curse of Eternal Youth from Eva and another apprentice witch, Sheila. Atelia, now one of the Three Sages, dispatches a special task force to recapture the fairies, but Arusu and her friends evade them, settling together in Dragon House.

During the witch evaluation, a hydra fairy attacks, revealing the fairies' escape to the warlocks. Arusu sacrifices herself by turning to stone to protect the realm, but she is revived by Qoo, a failed witch whose magic restores her. The warlocks soon invade, seeking the True Book of Spells, fairies, and a witch to perform dark magic. With the help of the enigmatic Sigma, Arusu and her friends infiltrate the Warlock Realm, where they discover a society ruled by science. After being exposed, they flee and are later sheltered by Wil, a rebel fighting for the oppressed wizards. At the Sanctuary, Sheila learns from Sigma of the impending destruction of their realm and the true gateway to the Human Realm. Following their escape, Arusu proposes forming the Magical Girl Squad to protect magic and fairies. During their celebration, Sheila drugs Arusu and sends her aboard Ludens, a ship deporting failed witches. Meanwhile, Sheila spies on the Three Sages under orders from the Grand Master of Witches, hoping to lift the curse from Eva. Arusu survives an explosion and returns with Lennon, who calls himself her "mirror." Meanwhile, Sigma, imprisoned alongside Jidan, learns of the archaeologist's past. Eva begins experiencing visions of an old man who strengthens her magic.

As tensions escalate, Atelia declares war on the warlocks, blaming them for the realm's decay. Arusu intervenes, urging cooperation instead of conflict. Atelia then reveals her past with Jidan and her role in Lennon's birth, shocking Arusu. When warlocks capture Lennon, mistaking him for Arusu, they demand the True Book of Spells in exchange for him and Jidan. Amid the chaos, warlock commander Luca brands humans as enemies for withholding dark magic. Atelia confesses her treachery and offers herself in Lennon's place, redirecting the crowd's anger. Arusu negotiates with Grande, surrendering the True Book of Spells to secure her father and Atelia's release. As Wizard Kingdom collapses, Sigma aids Arusu's escape, recognizing her as the prophesied savior. Jidan sacrifices himself to save Atelia at Hydra Lake, leaving Arusu distraught. Eva's magic wanes as a plague spreads, but after another vision, she regains her power through the True Book of Spells.

The realm begins crumbling under dark magic's influence, and Grande reveals that Eva's despair has made her his pawn. Understanding that dark magic thrives on negativity, Arusu rescues Eva, using the magic of light to restore the realm. United, witches and warlocks rebuild their world. The Grand Master lifts the curse from Sheila and Eva, inviting Arusu to remain, but she chooses to return home. After an emotional farewell, an interdimensional siren transports her back to Japan, where she is joyfully reunited with her parents.

== Broadcast and release ==
In 2003, it was announced at the Tokyo International Anime Fair that the anime Magical Girl Squad Arusu was going to be made. The anime first aired between April 9, 2004, and March 4, 2005; in all, 40 episodes were made plus an OVA that contains 6 episodes which were released in 2007.

It was translated and dubbed into English by the anime television network Animax, who broadcast it in its respective networks in Southeast Asia and was licensed for distribution in the United States by Media Blasters until 2012. It was licensed by AnimeWorks (Later called Media Blasters) under the English name Tweeny Witches with three DVDs being released in 2008. The OVA titled Tweeny Witches: The Adventures was also released on DVD by Media Blasters in 2009. In 2009, a complete collection for both the TV series and the OVA called Tweeny Witches: True Book of Spells was released. In 2010, a complete collection only for the TV series called Tweeny Witches: Core Collection was released. In 2012, a complete collection for both the TV series and the OVA called Tweeny Witches: Complete Collection was released.

== Episodes ==
=== Original series ===
No.	Title	Original release date	U.S. release date
1	"The Witch Realm"; Transliteration: "Majo no Kuni" (Japanese: 魔女の国)	April 9, 2004	March 18, 2008
2	"The 100 Fairy Species"; Transliteration: "Hyappiki no Yōsei" (Japanese: 百匹の妖精)	April 16, 2004	March 18, 2008
3	"Magical Brooms"; Transliteration: "Mahō no Hōki" (Japanese: 魔法のホーキ)	April 23, 2004	March 18, 2008
4	"The Ecoo Fairy"; Transliteration: "Yōsei Ekū" (Japanese: 妖精エクー)	April 30, 2004	March 18, 2008
5	"The Book of Spells"; Transliteration: "Madōsho" (Japanese: 魔導書)	May 7, 2004	March 18, 2008
6	"The Gryphon's Feather"; Transliteration: "Gurifon no Hane" (Japanese: グリフォンの羽根)	May 14, 2004	March 18, 2008
7	"The Piskey's Fang"; Transliteration: "Pisukī no Kiba" (Japanese: ピスキーの牙)	May 21, 2004	March 18, 2008
8	"The Port of Departure"; Transliteration: "Tabidachi no Minato" (Japanese: 旅立ちの港)	May 28, 2004	March 18, 2008
9	"Witch Evaluation"; Transliteration: "Majo Kentei" (Japanese: 魔女検定)	June 4, 2004	March 18, 2008
10	"Hydra's Attack"; Transliteration: "Haidora no Shūgeki" (Japanese: ハイドラの襲撃)	June 11, 2004	March 18, 2008
11	"Witches' Tradition"; Transliteration: "Majo no Dentō" (Japanese: 魔女の伝統)	June 18, 2004	March 18, 2008
12	"Happy Birthday"; Transliteration: "Happī Bāsudē" (Japanese: ハッピーバースデー)	June 25, 2004	March 18, 2008
13	"The Warlock Sigma"; Transliteration: "Mazoku Shiguma" (Japanese: 魔族シグマ)	July 2, 2004	March 18, 2008
14	"Sheila's Quandary"; Transliteration: "Shīra no Mayoi" (Japanese: シーラの迷い)	July 9, 2004	March 18, 2008
15	"Cursed Magic"; Transliteration: "Norowareta Mahō" (Japanese: 呪われた魔法)	July 16, 2004	May 6, 2008
16	"Eva's Courage"; Transliteration: "Eba no Yūki" (Japanese: エバの勇気)	July 23, 2004	May 6, 2008
17	"Invade the Warlock Realm!"; Transliteration: "Sennyū! Mazokukai" (Japanese: 潜入!魔族界)	September 3, 2004	May 6, 2008
18	"The True Wizard"; Transliteration: "Shin no Uizādo" (Japanese: 真のウィザード)	September 10, 2004	May 6, 2008
19	"Backs Against the Wall"; Transliteration: "Zettai Zetsumei" (Japanese: 絶体絶命)	September 17, 2004	May 6, 2008
20	"Magical Girl Squad"; Transliteration: "Mahō Shōjo Tai" (Japanese: 魔法少女隊)	September 24, 2004	May 6, 2008
21	"Interdimensional Sea"; Transliteration: "Ijigen no Umi" (Japanese: 異次元の海)	October 1, 2004	May 6, 2008
22	"The Pirate Lennon"; Transliteration: "Kaizoku Renon" (Japanese: 海賊レノン)	October 8, 2004	May 6, 2008
23	"Traitor Among the Witches"; Transliteration: "Uragiri no Majo" (Japanese: 裏切りの魔女)	October 15, 2004	May 6, 2008
24	"Light of Hope"; Transliteration: "Kibō no Hikari" (Japanese: 希望の光)	October 22, 2004	May 6, 2008
25	"Suspicion"; Transliteration: "Giwaku" (Japanese: 疑惑)	October 29, 2004	May 6, 2008
26	"Splintered Hearts"; Transliteration: "Barabara na Kokoro" (Japanese: バラバラな心)	November 5, 2004	May 6, 2008
27	"Destruction Foreshadowed"; Transliteration: "Metsubō no Zenchō" (Japanese: 滅亡の前兆)	November 12, 2004	May 6, 2008
28	"Full-scale Attack"; Transliteration: "Sōkōgeki" (Japanese: 総攻撃)	November 19, 2004	May 6, 2008
29	"The True Book of Spells"; Transliteration: "Shin no Madōsho" (Japanese: 真の魔導書)	November 26, 2004	July 22, 2008
30	"Lennon's True Identity"; Transliteration: "Renon no Shōtai" (Japanese: レノンの正体)	December 3, 2004	July 22, 2008
31	"Anguished Heart"; Transliteration: "Setsunai Omoi" (Japanese: 切ない思い)	January 2, 2005	July 22, 2008
32	"The One Thing That Must Be Protected"; Transliteration: "Hontō ni Mamoru Beki Mono" (Japanese: 本当に守るべきもの)	January 21, 2005	July 22, 2008
33	"Dad's Alive"; Transliteration: "Papa wa Ikiteiru" (Japanese: パパは生きている)	January 28, 2005	July 22, 2008
34	"Promise"; Transliteration: "Yakusoku" (Japanese: 約束)	January 28, 2005	July 22, 2008
35	"Collapse"; Transliteration: "Hōkai" (Japanese: 崩壊)	February 4, 2005	July 22, 2008
36	"Escape"; Transliteration: "Dasshutsu" (Japanese: 脱出)	February 11, 2005	July 22, 2008
37	"Demise"; Transliteration: "Shūen" (Japanese: 終焉)	February 18, 2005	July 22, 2008
38	"Dark Magic"; Transliteration: "Kuro Mahō" (Japanese: 黒魔法)	February 15, 2005	July 22, 2008
39	"Light Magic"; Transliteration: "Hikari no Mahō" (Japanese: 光の魔法)	March 4, 2005	July 22, 2008
40	"Hope"; Transliteration: "Kibō" (Japanese: 希望)	March 4, 2005	July 22, 2008

=== The Adventures ===
No. overall	U.S. episode no.	Title	Written by	Original release date	U.S. release date
1	1	"The Magical Girl Squad Transformed Into Fish!"; Transliteration: "Sakana ni Natta Mahō Shōjo Tai" (Japanese: 魚になった魔法少女隊)	Sunao Katabuchi	November 22, 2007	February 17, 2009
2	5	"A Heart Sealed Away"; Transliteration: "Fūin Sareta Kokoro" (Japanese: 封印された心)	Yūko Kawabe	November 22, 2007	February 17, 2009
3	2	"The Fairy Chronicles"; Transliteration: "Yōsei Hakusho" (Japanese: 妖精白書)	Yūko Kawabe	November 22, 2007	February 17, 2009
4	3	"The Ice Witch and the Dragon of Fire and Ice"; Transliteration: "Kōri no Majo to Hyōen no Ryū" (Japanese: 氷の魔女と氷炎の竜)	Sunao Katabuchi; Eiko Tanaka	November 22, 2007	February 17, 2009
5	4	"The Secret of Dragon House"; Transliteration: "Doragon Hausu no Himitsu" (Japanese: ドラゴンハウスの秘密)	Yūko Kawabe	November 22, 2007	February 17, 2009
6	6	"Magical Girl Squad Storm and Stress"; Transliteration: "Shippū Dotō no Mahō Shōjo Tai" (Japanese: 疾風怒涛の魔法少女隊)	Sunao Katabuchi; Eiko Tanaka	November 22, 2007	February 17, 2009

== Reception ==
The anime has received mixed feedback from reviewers: Ain't It Cool News said that the anime can be thought of as a "There will be blood" type as well as being "Spicy" structurally. The review goes on to say that the anime fan should "at least give it a try" and "warrants appreciation". Rachael Carothers and Ronald J Duncan from Anime News Network both gave a good review. Ronald said that while the idea of a character traveling to another world and gaining the ability to do magic isn't original, the series is different. He stated the episodes were well paced, had a fun main character, and the artwork was beautiful. Rachael praised the art as "extremely beautiful animation" and background music that "fits in so well". Theron Martin from Anime News Network gave the first DVD a B rating for both the sub and dub and went on to say that it was a "fresh twist on a well-established genre" but it raised animation shortcuts to annoying new levels. Chris Beveridge from Mania.com gave the DVD a mixed review with a C rating. Chris went on to say that the story was "slow moving and stilted"; however, he went on to say that his eight-year-old daughter was "plenty fascinated by it", something the creator was aiming at. Carl Kimlinger from Anime News Network gave the 2nd DVD a B− for both the sub and dub and went on to say that the animation was great and the lead character was "lively" but that the direction was "cold and over complex". The third DVD received a C+ rating from him for both dub and sub, again the artwork was praised but the story was lacking a great deal. For the OVA Carl gave it a B− rating again for both sub and dub. The OVA was praised for its fast pace, action, and adventure, but is "too somber and slow".

Chris Beveridge from Maina.com gave the 2nd DVD a better review stating that the "imagery presented, especially towards the end, was very grandiose and epic" but again cited the pacing of the story as a flaw. For the 3rd and final DVD Chris stated that the ending felt "pretty complete" and was "fairly predictable". He later went on to say that the best moments tended to come with the secondary characters but overall did not capture or hold his attention. Chris rated the OVA as being lighter and more accessible nut at times going over the top, in all the review was good. Chris has placed the anime at #4 of the 10 most underrated anime. Mark Thomas from Mania.com said it is something that parents could get into with their children, and a "little bit of Harry Potter, mixed with some Don Bluth, add a dash of Ralph Bakshi." makes it an odd, but fun, combination.
