= Mahiro Maeda =

Japanese anime director (born 1963)

- Born: March 14, 1963 (age 63); Yonago, Tottori, Japan
- Occupations: Anime director, animator, designer

Signature
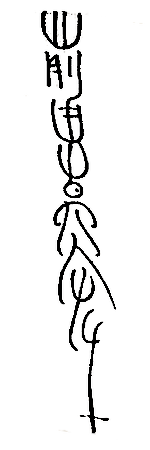

Mahiro Maeda (前田 真宏 Maeda Mahiro; born March 14, 1963) is a Japanese anime director, character designer, and animator.

Helen McCarthy in 500 Essential Anime Movies called him "one of the most imaginative visualists in anime". He also worked on Concept Art and Design for Mad Max: Fury Road (2015), which won six Academy Awards. He has been one of the top contributors at the anime studio GONZO for many years, having directed Blue Submarine No. 6, Final Fantasy: Unlimited and Gankutsuou: The Count of Monte Cristo.

His design work ranges from 2 of the "Angels" in Neon Genesis Evangelion to production and mechanical design for such series as Magic User's Club (魔法使いTai!, Mahō Tsukai Tai!), The Vision of Escaflowne and Last Exile. He was also one of the designers for Gate Keepers 21.

His earlier years were spent mostly at the famed Studio Ghibli, where he helped animate classics such as Nausicaä of the Valley of the Wind, Castle in the Sky, and Porco Rosso. Maeda is one of the select Japanese directors to actively collaborate with the international film media on various projects. He provided key animation for the animation sequence in Quentin Tarantino's Kill Bill Vol. 1. His directorial work has also been featured in such exclusive package films as The Animatrix (segment: "The Second Renaissance Parts I and II"), Genius Party Beyond (segment: "Gala"), and Ani*Kuri15 (segment: "Princess Onmitsu"). He has also visited the American Anime Expo convention in 2000 and 2003.
