= Sweat Punch =

Japanese OVA series

スウェットパンチ (Sweat Punch)
- Genre: Short subject (Musical, Sci-fi, Gothic, Mecha)
- Original video animation
- Directed by: Hidekazu Ohara; Osamu Kobayashi; Kazuto Nakazawa; Yasushi Muraki; Nobutaka Ito
- Produced by: Eiko Tanaka
- Studio: Studio 4°C
- Released: 2001 – January 25, 2007
- Runtime: 52 minutes
- Episodes: 5

Sweat Punch (スウェットパンチ, Suuettopanchi) is a series of five Studio 4°C shorts collected in January 2007 as a direct-to-DVD package film titled Deep Imagination. The first four shorts had previously featured on the 4-volume "DVD magazine" series, Grasshoppa! (グラスホッパー！, Gurasuhoppa!), with one Sweat Punch episode per Grasshoppa! DVD. Upon collection and release in 2007's Deep Imagination, a fifth short was added to the Sweat Punch series. Each short is directed by a different director, and the shorts deal with a variety of subjects.

== Professor Dan Petory's Blues ==
A 10-minute short directed by Hidekazu Ohara, "Professor Dan Petory's Blues" (「タンペトリー教授の憂鬱」, "Tanpetori Kyouju no Yuuutsu") is a musical number starring a hand puppet named Junior. The puppet is controlled by the drunken Professor Dan Petory who explains in puppetry the answers to such questions as why the Earth is blue and why UFOs fly in a zig-zag pattern.

== End of the World ==
A 10-minute short directed by Osamu Kobayashi, "End of the World" is a science fiction story about a young alien girl named Yuko as she escapes from the world of humans. After returning to her own world with Kazumi, a human girl she met at a rock concert on Earth, Yuko wages a retaliatory campaign against hordes of S&M monsters, and the evil queen of Yuko's world. The music featured is by the all-girl punk rock group, Lolita No.18. The short features the voice-talent of Hikaru Midorikawa.

== Comedy ==
An 11-minute short directed by Kazuto Nakazawa, the gothic "Comedy" (「喜劇」, "Kigeki") is based on Shubert's "Demon King," and features the two Schubert pieces, "Ellens dritter Gesang" and "Erlkönig".

The story details the adventures of a pale young girl (Ai Maeda) during the Irish War of Independence. She who travels to the Demon’s Castle in search of the infamous Black Swordsman (Hikaru Midorikawa) who has the power to utterly decimate entire armies. She hoped to recruit him to defeat the English soldiers, but he was rumored to only accept a particular genre of book as payment for his services. She took him a copy of Denney's Comedy, and upon receiving the book, the swordsman engulfed himself in reading it. When the English attack was imminent, the Black Swordsman finished the novel and intercepted and killed the 200 English soldiers. The bodies disappeared, leaving only their armor. The swordsman, his mouth covered in blood, warned the girl not tell anyone what happened or he would kill her.

== Beyond ==
An 8-minute short directed by Yasushi Muraki, "Beyond" (「彼岸」, "Higan") is a mecha piece set in a battlefield. The story revolves around three soldiers in mech powersuits who are engaged in a fight to the death against two mobile tanks.

== Junk Town ==
A 13-minute short, "Junk Town" (「ガラクタの町」, "Garakuta no Machi") represents the directorial debut of Nobutaka Ito. This is a science fiction story about a young boy who discovers and befriends a small robot at a shopping arcade. The robot is hungry and he grows in size as he devours a number of machines of increasing size.
