= Future Kid Takara =

Japanese anime television series

- Key visual
- Anime television series
- Directed by: Yuta Sano
- Produced by: Shun Hasegawa
- Written by: Shinji Obara
- Studio: Studio 4°C
- Original network: NHK Educational TV
- Original run: November 8, 2025 – November 9, 2025
- Episodes: 11

Future Kid Takara is a Japanese original anime television series produced by Beyond C. and animated by Studio 4°C. The series is directed by Yuta Sano, produced by Shun Hasegawa, and written by Shinji Obara, with original character designs handled by Shinji Kimura. The 11-episode short-form series originally premiered at the Osaka World Expo on September 25, 2025, and it aired between November 8 and 9 of the same year on NHK Educational TV. The theme song is "Chikyu no Namida" (地球のなみだ) performed by Yuki Kaji and Honoka Yoshida.

== Characters ==
Takara (タカラ)
Voiced by: Yuki Kaji
Sara (サラ)
Voiced by: Honoka Yoshida
Sugar (シュガー, Shugā)
Voiced by: Keiko Toda
Dr. Amory (エイモリー博士, Eimorī Hakase)
Voiced by: Yūki Kaji
Naomi (ナオミ)
Voiced by: Keiko Toda
Genji (源じぃ)
Voiced by: Yūki Kaji
Announcer (アナウンサー, Anaunsā)
Voiced by: Keiko Toda
Ranfo (ランフォ)
