= Shinichirō Watanabe =

Japanese anime director (born 1965)

- 渡辺 信一郎
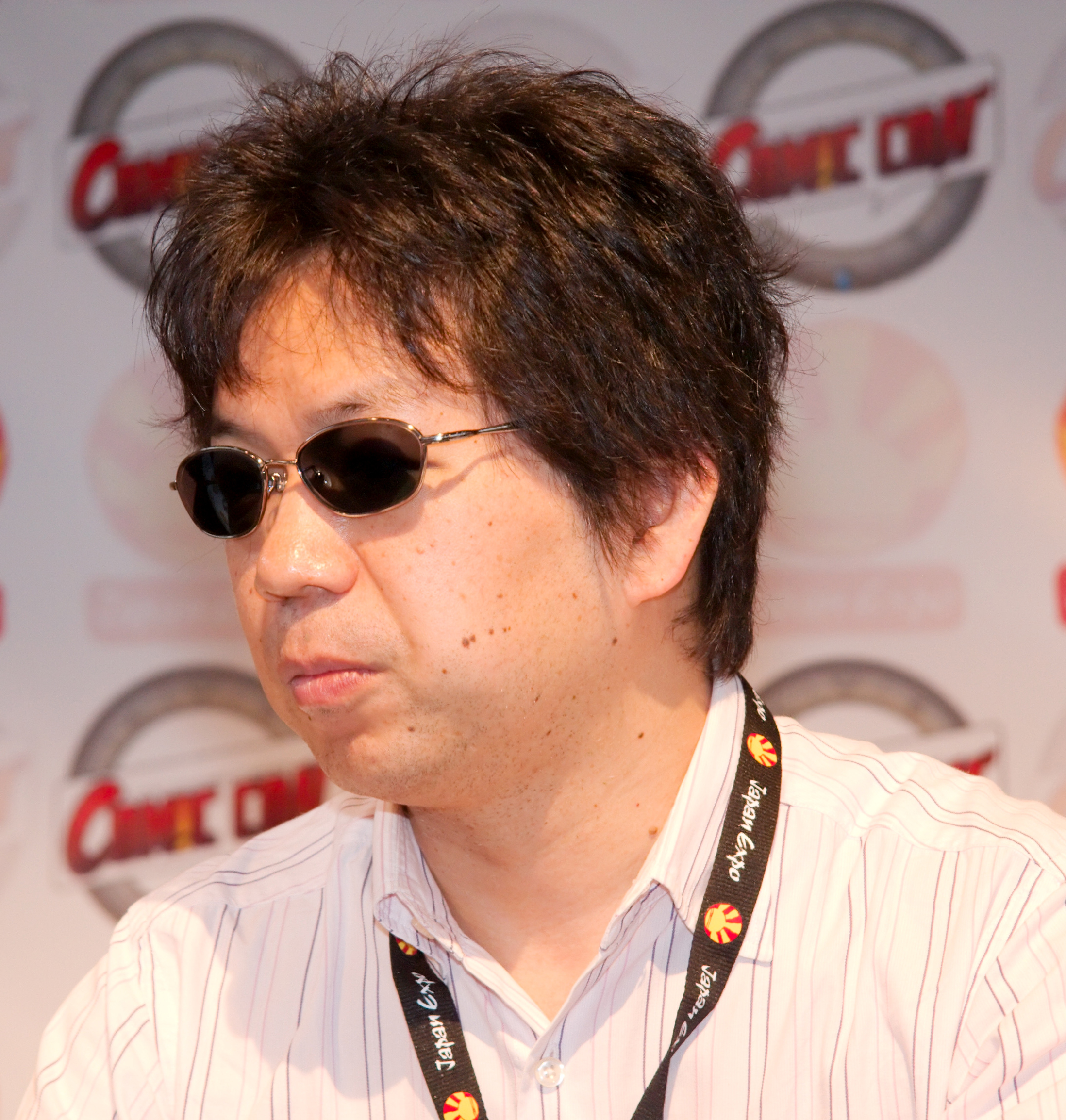
- Watanabe at the 2009 Japan Expo
- Born: May 24, 1965 (age 61); Kyoto, Japan
- Occupations: Anime television director, film director
- Years active: 1990–present

Shinichirō Watanabe (渡辺 信一郎, Watanabe Shin'ichirō; born May 24, 1965) is a Japanese anime television and film director, best known for directing the critically acclaimed and commercially successful anime series Cowboy Bebop, Macross Plus, Samurai Champloo, Space Dandy, Terror in Resonance, and Carole & Tuesday. Watanabe's work is characterized by evocative uses of music, mature themes, and the incorporation of multiple film genres.

== Career ==
Watanabe was born in Kyoto in 1965. After joining the Japanese animation studio Sunrise, he supervised the episode direction and storyboards of numerous Sunrise anime, and soon made his directorial debut as co-director of the well-received Macross update, Macross Plus. His next effort, and first full directorial venture, was the 1998 series Cowboy Bebop, which received universal praise and is considered by many to be one of the greatest anime series of all time. It was followed by the 2001 film Knockin' on Heaven's Door. In 2003, Watanabe directed his first American-produced anime, the short films Kid's Story and A Detective Story, both parts of The Wachowskis' The Animatrix, an anthology of animated short stories from The Matrix. His next directorial effort was the critically acclaimed 2004 anime series Samurai Champloo which began broadcasting on Fuji Television in Japan on May 19, 2004.

Following the release of Samurai Champloo, Watanabe directed a short film called Baby Blue, which was released on July 7, 2007, as a segment of the anthology film Genius Party. In recent years, he has been active as a creative music producer, overseeing the 2004 film Mind Game, 2008's Michiko & Hatchin, and supervising the storyboards for episode 12 of Tetsuwan Birdy: Decode. In 2012, he directed the anime series Kids on the Slope (Japanese title: Sakamichi no Apollon), a coming-of-age story about young jazz musicians, which premiered in April 2012 on Fuji TV's Noitamina block.

In 2009, it was announced that Watanabe would be working as an associate producer on the upcoming live-action adaptation of Cowboy Bebop, alongside his fellow Sunrise staff members Kenji Uchida and Keiko Nobumoto. During FicZone in Granada, Spain, it was reported that Watanabe was collaborating with anime studio BONES on a space science-fiction comedy. BONES subsequently confirmed that the studio was working with Watanabe, but did not confirm the genre of the series. In late 2013, the original trailers for Space Dandy were released to the public. The dubbed version premiered on Adult Swim on its Toonami block on January 4, 2014, in the United States, hours before airing in Japan. He is frequently ranked among Japan's best animation directors.

Watanabe directed the anime short film Blade Runner Black Out 2022, which was released in 2017. On November 29, 2018, it was announced that he would be creative producer of Blade Runner: Black Lotus, an anime series produced for Adult Swim and Crunchyroll.

He received an associate producer credit on the Netflix adaptation of Cowboy Bebop but was not involved in its production and criticized it after its release.

In 2024, while promoting the upcoming series Lazarus, Watanabe confirmed in an interview with ANN that all of his original projects, including both sci-fi and historical shows, take place in the same universe. However, he did not elaborate on any specific chronology or canon.

== Works ==
=== Television productions ===
As director

- Macross Plus (1994)
- Cowboy Bebop (1998)

Cowboy Bebop, directed by Shinichiro Watanabe, is recognized for combining science fiction, film noir, and jazz into a Japanese anime storytelling style one of the most noticeable things about the series is that its soundtrack, composed by Yoko Kanno, plays a very important role in shaping the show's pacing, emotional tone, and helping distinguish it from themes of loneliness, globalization, and postmodern identity through the complex narratives, structure, and visual style. The series drew inspiration from American cinema, particularly western and noir films, while still being able to maintain stylistic elements associated with Japanese animations.

- Samurai Champloo (2004)

Samurai Champloo is another series directed by Watanabe, known for combining Edo-period Japan with modern hip-hop aesthetics and music. The series follows three travelers whose journeys are shaped by themes of social class, individuality, and freedom while incorporating graffiti-inspired visuals, complex choreography, and modern dialogue. The soundtrack of the show, particularly composed by Nujabes, plays a major role in connecting traditional Japanese settings with global music culture. The series is also known for blending historical fiction with modern influences in a way that challenges conventional samurai anime storytelling. With its experimental style and multicultural influences, Samurai Champloo became a nationwide example of genre fusion within anime, helping expand international interest in Japanese animation.

- Kids on the Slope (2012)
- Space Dandy (2014, chief director)

Space Dandy, also directed by Watanabe, is another science fiction comedy series widely recognized for its eye-catching animation and storytelling that is able to draw its audience in through its complex narratives and ability to showcase emotion through scenes. The series follows alien hunters traveling through space while parodying science fiction films, anime tropes, and popular culture references. Unlike many serialized anime, Space Dandy allows different directors and animation teams to develop individual episodes with a very distinct stylistic approach and narratives. The creative freedom encouraged artistic experimentation and showcased a wide range of animation techniques across the series. Throughout the series, the soundtrack is also very interesting. While exploring space, the soundtrack follows a disco funk theme composed by Yasuyuki Okamura and Etsuko Yakushimaru. The music in the series is able to convey what's happening in the scene where it can go from something comedic to serious to heart warming. The music range in Space Dandy is very wide and works with the show very well. Space Dandy demonstrates Watanabe's continued influence on modern anime storytelling and global animation culture.

- Terror in Resonance (2014)
- Carole & Tuesday (2019, chief director)
- Lazarus (2025)

Other

- Mobile Suit Gundam 0083: Stardust Memory (1991; episode director)
- The Vision of Escaflowne (1996; episode director (5, 8), storyboard artist (5, 8, 12, 16))
- Ergo Proxy (2006; storyboard artist (19))
- Birdy the Mighty: Decode (2008; storyboard artist (12), episode director (12))
- Michiko & Hatchin (2008; music producer)
- Lupin the Third: The Woman Called Fujiko Mine (2012; music producer)
- Death Parade (2015; unit director (ED))
- Sonny Boy (2021; music advisor)
- Blade Runner: Black Lotus (2021; creative director)

=== Films ===
Full length

- Macross Plus: Movie Edition (1995; director)
- Cowboy Bebop: The Movie (2001; director)
- Mind Game (2004; music producer)

Shorts

- The Animatrix (2003; director, "Detective's Story", "Kid's Story")
- Genius Party (2007; director of "Baby Blue")
- Blade Runner Black Out 2022 (2017; director)
- Edge of Time (2022; director of "A Girl Meets a Boy and a Robot")

=== Music videos ===
- "More" (featuring Anderson .Paak) – Flying Lotus (2019; director)

== Use of music ==
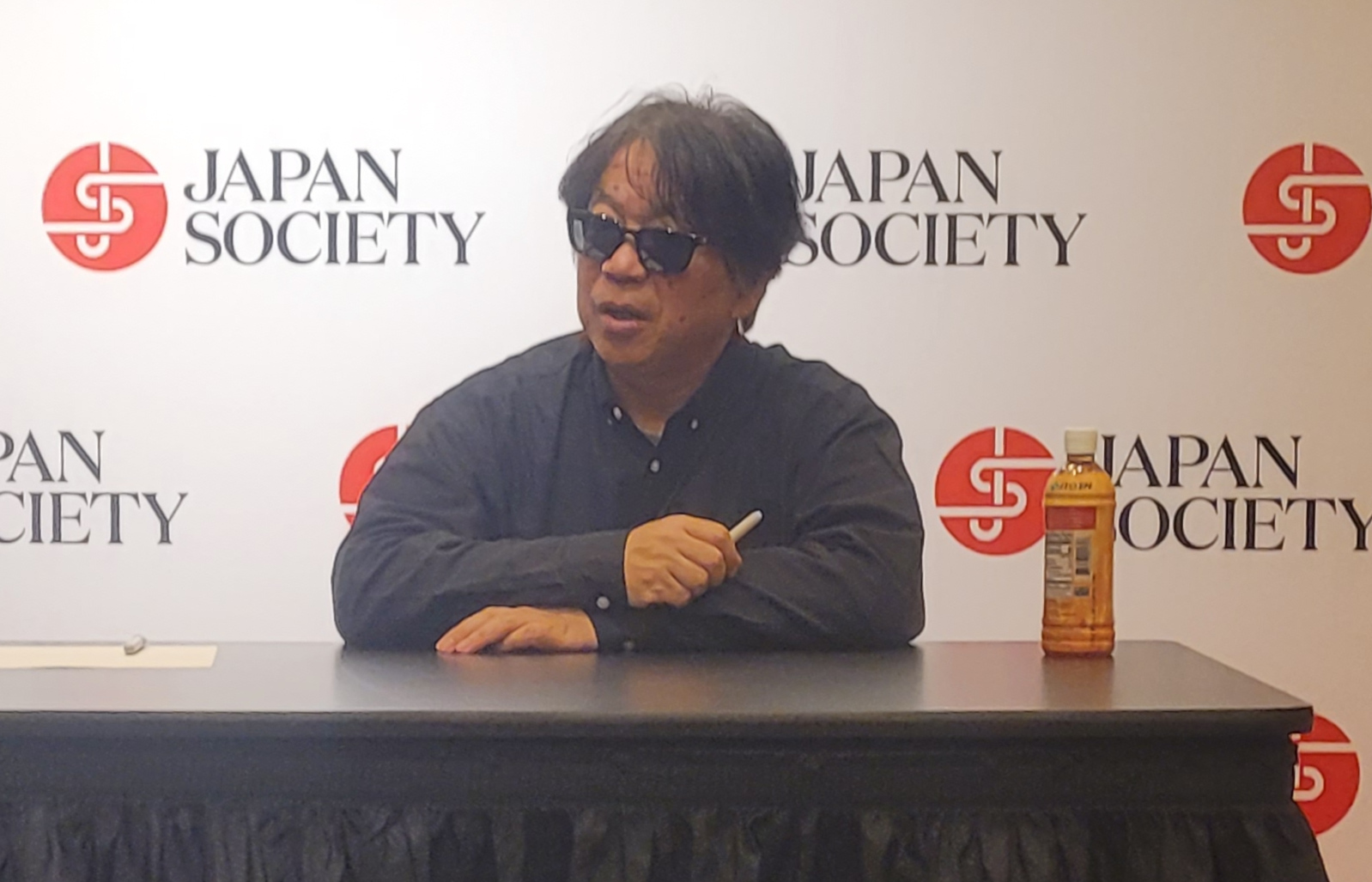
Watanabe at Japan Society in November 2025

Watanabe regards the film score of his works as very important, and has said that music is the universal language. Cowboy Bebop is heavily influenced by American culture, especially the jazz movements of the 1940s, hence the title "bebop". This style is blended with a score by the prolific composer Yoko Kanno featuring jazz, blues and funk music. The anachronistic soundtrack of Samurai Champloo, though an Edo period piece, draws heavily from hip hop music, while the later series Kids on the Slope demonstrates many classical forms of jazz, and Space Dandy draws from primarily new wave music. His series Terror in Resonance utilizes post-rock and ambient music influenced by Icelandic band Sigur Rós. His series Carole and Tuesday features two young musicians trying to make their way in life and features their work in-setting heavily.
