= Digital Juice (OVA) =

Japanese OVA series

- Anime
- Directed by: Hiroaki Ando; Osamu Kobayashi; Kôji Morimoto; Hidekazu Ohara; Tatsuyuki Tanaka; Kazuyoshi Yaginuma
- Produced by: Eiko Tanaka
- Studio: Studio 4°C
- Released: January 25, 2002

Digital Juice is a series of six Studio 4°C shorts collected in January 2002 as a direct-to-DVD package film. Each short is directed by a different director. The shorts deal with a variety of subjects, but they share an emphasis on psychological issues, fantasy, and mystery.

== Overview ==
=== Lords of the Sword ===
A 2-minute and 9 second short directed by Hidekazu Ohara, "Lords of the Sword" (圭角, Keikaku) takes place in a town in the Muromachi era, and is characterized by intense action.

=== Chicken's Insurance ===
A 3-minute and 25 second short directed by Hiroaki Ando, "Chicken's Insurance" (チキン保険に加入ください) is a CGI animation about chickens and supposedly produced by chickens. The short features the vocal talents of Yūji Ueda who plays the role of Chicken.

=== Tojin Kit ===
A 31-second short directed by Tatsuyuki Tanaka, "Tojin Kit" (陶人キット 予告編) represents a portion of preview footage for Tatsuyuki Tanaka's first original manga.

=== In the Evening of a Moonlit Night ===
A 4-minute and 26 second short, "In the Evening of a Moonlit Night" (月夜の晩に, Tsukiyo no Ban ni) represents the directorial debut of Kazuyoshi Yaginuma. A simple tale of a girl and two boys, the short is characterized by intense color.

=== Table & Fishman ===
A 5-minute and 18 second short directed by Osamu Kobayashi, "Table & Fishman" is a love story between a fish-man named Jack (Hisao Egawa) and his companion named Stefany (Yūko Nagashima). After coming upon a symbol for infinity, the two find themselves racing rapidly into the infinite. Along the way they encounter a bewildering variety of fellow travelers including the Great Western King (Hirofumi Tanaka), the Queen of Singer (Yuka Komatsu), the Mini Prince (Tomoko Kaneda), and the mysterious Samu (Keisaku Baba).

=== The Saloon in the Air ===
A 4-minute and 26 second short directed by Kôji Morimoto, "The Saloon in the Air" (空中居酒屋) is set in a saloon floating high in the sky. The story is told from the perspective of Wine-chan and recounts a sequence of events that unfold one strange evening as a number of bizarre characters gather at the saloon. "Aerial Bar" is notably shot primarily in live-action instead of animation as Morimoto is known for.
