= Kimagure Robot =

2004 original video animation series

きまぐれロボット (Kimagure Robotto)
- Original video animation
- Directed by: Yoshiharu Ashino; Yasuyuki Shimizu; Chie Uratani; Masahiko Kubo; Yumi Chiba; Yasuhiro Aoki; Nobutaka Ito
- Written by: Shinichi Hoshi
- Music by: Seiichi Yamamoto
- Studio: Studio 4°C
- Released: 2004
- Runtime: 2 minutes each
- Episodes: 10

Kimagure Robot (きまぐれロボット) is a series of ten two-minute shorts that were sponsored by Yahoo! as a free promotion for Yahoo! Japan. The episodes were broadcast in 2004 and most shorts were directed by a different Studio 4°C director. Plotlines were all developed by science fiction writer Shinichi Hoshi—renowned for having created more than a thousand shorts and known in Japan as the "God of Short Shorts". Because Hoshi was famous for being protective of the integrity of his works during his lifetime, the idea of releasing the series as a webcast was only proposed after Hoshi had died in the late 1990s.

All ten episodes are characterized by a futuristic science-fiction setting in which an eccentric scientist with a genius for invention works to create a host of robots, each designed to help humans in a different but very particular and often counter intuitive manner. As the robots interact with their human masters and their surroundings in pre-programmed ways unanticipated problems arise and provide for a variety of comedic situations.

== Production ==
Despite initial plans for further installments, no additional series were produced.

== Episodes ==
No.	Title	Directed by
1	"The Capricious Robot""; Transliteration: "Kimagure Robotto" (きまぐれロボット)	Yoshiharu Ashino
The millionaire Mr N visits the doctor and his assistant asking for a robotic servant for his villa. Later at the villa, the robot is performing wonderfully and begins to turn into a beautiful woman. Just as the robot seems to be about to kiss Mr N, guns spring out of it and fire on Mr N. Mr N complains to the doctor, but it is revealed that this is a feature of the robot which will never allow the owner to become bored.
2	"The Night Incident"; Transliteration: "Yoru no Jiken" (夜の事件)	Yasuyuki Shimizu
The doctor has just put the finishing touches on a robotic greeter for an amusement park. Later that night, aliens from the planet KILL arrive. They mistake the robotic greeter for an actual human and after being bewildered and disappointed at the robotic greeter's lack of terror and seeming indifference to being shot, they give up and leave.
3	"Three Wishes"; Transliteration: "Mittsu no Negai" (3つの願い)	Chie Uratani
A man ice fishing catches a jar with the doctor's image emblazoned on the outside. Within the jar is a robot who will grant the man three wishes. The man wishes for a fish and, upon receiving a very small fish, wishes for a bigger fish which the robot pulls out of the lake. Impressed at the size of the new fish, he wishes for the largest "catch" in the lake. The robot now pulls out of the ice-fishing hole the Loch Ness Monster, which breaks all of the ice on the lake, leaving the man with no fish. The robot goes back in its jar.
4	"The Sleepy Robot"; Transliteration: "Neboke Robotto" (ねぼけロボット)	Masahiko Kubo
Two astronauts are planning their vacation when something goes wrong in the cargo hold. They discover a "space plant" has gotten loose and is dissolving the walls of their spaceship. They open some of the other boxes of cargo, all of which have the doctor's logo on them, to try to find a robot to help them combat the plant. Unfortunately, they find only a robotic comedian, chef, ping-pong player and ballerina. Then they open the box containing the "superlative robo" which is supposed to be the most human-like robot in the cargo. The superlative robo however only walks up to the plant and pees on the floor in front of it. The two astronauts despair of ever destroying the plant, but a title-card informs the audience that once the superlative robot had fully woken up, it saved the day.
5	"Emissary of Civilization"; Transliteration: "Bunmei no Shisha" (文明の使者)	Yumi Chiba
The doctor and his assistant journey across the galaxy, in search of aliens to civilize with the aid of his new "evolution robot." They land a planet populated entirely by cats. The robot generates a pill which transforms the cats into cat-people. The doctor quickly brings the cat-people through the major eras of human history. After basking in his success, he prepares to leave, but is told that the cat-people, to show their gratitude, have constructed a memorial statue. The doctor is dismayed to find that the statue is not of him, but of the robot. In space, he reflects that as far as the cat-people had come, they still couldn't recognize his genius.
6	"The Mysterious Robot"; Transliteration: "Nazo no Robotto" (謎のロボット)	Yasuhiro Aoki
A young boy in the doctor's lab is intrigued by a robot that seemingly has no purpose, but follows the doctor everywhere. The assistant shrugs when questioned and the doctor insists that it does have a purpose, but refuses to say what. In an effort to discover the purpose of the robot, the boy puts the doctor in various dangerous situations but each time the doctor is in trouble, the robot does nothing but watch him struggle. Later that night, alone in his room with the robot, the doctor reveals to the audience that the robot is a diary-writing robot, but that if the boy were to know this, it would spoil the surprise robot that the doctor had been working on for him.
7	"Spy Catcher"; Transliteration: "Supaikyattchaa" (スパイキャッチャー)	Yasuhiro Aoki
Two talented ninjas try to break into the doctor's factory to steal a painting. They make their way past robotic guards and traps, but are caught at the very end by the doctor's latest spy-catching robot, who informs them that they are the 100th spies to be caught. They smile and their picture is taken in front of the painting.
8	"Beware of Fires"; Transliteration: "Hi no Youjin" (火の用心)	Yasuyuki Shimizu
A young boy who loves robots eagerly shows off his fire-detector robot to the doctor. The robot flies about the room, chanting "beware of fires," believing a Bunsen burner to be a dangerous fire. The doctor tells the boy it needs improvement. The boy returns with the robot, now having added a fire-extinguisher and making it only react to larger amounts of heat. As a result, the robot flies down to the doctor's generator room and wreaks havoc trying to extinguish it. The doctor this time repairs the robot and shows it to the boy. As soon as it is released, it flies up to the sun to try and extinguish it. The boy, the doctor, and the assistant express their dismay.
9	"The Purpose of the Invasion"; Transliteration: "Shūrai no Mokuteki" (襲来の目的)	Yasuhiro Aoki
A monster descends from a UFO. The military tries to display peaceful behavior to the monster by offering it food and standing in heart-shaped formations. When the monster isn't quelled by this, they call upon the doctor, who deploys his "carnival robot." The carnival robot flies into the monster's face and detonates itself in a shower of fire-works, killing the monster who it appears was robot itself the entire time. Later, a second UFO arrives and announces that the monster was part of an elaborate test which humanity has passed due to their peaceful actions. Candy rains from the sky and the assistant and a general argue over pronunciation.
10	"The Drug"; Transliteration: "Kusuri" (薬)	Nobutaka Ito
In a bid for the Nobel Prize, the doctor invents a youth-restoring pill. He accidentally swallows it, causing himself to become younger and younger. He quickly tries to build a time-machine robot to accelerate time in his laboratory before he reverts to infancy. He completes the robot, but is now too small to hold the remote-control to turn it on. The pill finally transforms him completely into a baby, but the day is saved when his assistant enters the lab and accidentally steps on the remote, causing the robot to activate. The doctor returns to normal, but now the assistant has become an old woman.

== Voice cast ==
- Megumi Matsumoto - The Doctor's Assistant and all other female characters
- Toshiyuki Itakura - The Doctor and all other male voices

== Reception ==
Reception for the series has been positive in Japan and in the West.

AnimeNation's John Oppliger described Kimagure Robot as an "artistic and esoteric anime" and decried the lack of awareness of complex and avant-garde titles like this in American anime consumers.

The Encyclopedia of Science Fiction described Kimagure Robot as a mostly entertaining collection of short science-fiction comedies, noting that the two-minute episodes generally follow a simple structure built around a humorous setup and concluding gag. It praised the varied and interesting animation styles resulting from the involvement of seven directors, considering them characteristic of Studio 4°C's experimental approach. The encyclopedia also highlighted the series' use of familiar science-fiction concepts, including robots, alien invasions, uplift and time manipulation, as sources of absurdist humor. It noted the adaptation's historical significance as a rare screen interpretation of stories by Shinichi Hoshi, a pioneer of Japanese science fiction who had refused requests to adapt his works during his lifetime.
