= Kazuto Nakazawa =

Japanese anime director

- Born: March 4, 1968 (age 58); Niigata Prefecture, Japan
- Other name: Takeshi Tsuji (辻 武司)
- Education: Tokyo Animator Academy
- Occupations: Anime director, animator, illustrator, character designer

Kazuto Nakazawa (中澤 一登, Nakazawa Kazuto; born March 4, 1968) is a Japanese character designer and director of numerous anime series and video games who also goes by the pseudonym Takeshi Tsuji (辻 武司, Tsuji Takeshi). His directorial work includes Parasite Dolls, the anime sequence in Kill Bill: Volume 1, and the Moondrive segment of Genius Party Beyond. He has designed characters for many anime, such as Ashita no Nadja and Samurai Champloo, for which he also served as animation director. In addition to his work with anime, he designed the characters of Tales of Legendia and was the animation director of Devil Kings. Throughout his career, he has worked also as an animator, providing key animations to anime such as The Animatrix's "Kid's Story" and "A Detective Story". He has made two appearances at anime conventions in the United States: at Otakon in 1999 and 2006. He also animated the Joe Hahn-directed music video for the Linkin Park song "Breaking the Habit."

== Filmography ==
=== TV series ===
- El-Hazard (1995) – character designer, chief animation director
- Tenchi in Tokyo (1997) – character designer, chief animation director
- Black Heaven (1999) – character designer
- Final Fantasy: Unlimited (2001) – character designer
- Ashita no Nadja (2003) – character designer
- Samurai Champloo (2004) – character designer, chief animation director
- Yurururu ~Nichijou Hen~ (2007) – director
- House of Five Leaves (2010) – character designer, chief animation director
- Terror in Resonance (2014) – character designer, chief animation director
- Days (2016) – character designer
- B: The Beginning (2018) - creator, director, character designer, key animation supervisor
- Fena: Pirate Princess (2021) – creator, director, original character designer

=== Films ===
- Hells Angels (2008) – character designer
- Genius Party Beyond: Moondrive (2008) – director, character designer
- Musashi: The Dream of the Last Samurai (2009) – character designer
- COMEDY SKIT (Hitman) 1989 (2015) – director

=== OVAs/ONAs ===
- El Hazard: The Magnificent World (1995) – character designer
- Starship Girl Yamamoto Yohko (1996) – character designer
- Battle Arena Toshinden (1996) – character designer
- Starship Girl Yamamoto Yohko II (1997) – character designer
- El Hazard 2: The Magnificent World (1997) – character designer
- COMEDY (2002) – director
- Parasite Dolls (2003) – director
- Vassalord (2013) – director
- B: The Beginning (2018) – creator, director, character designer, chief animation director
- B: The Beginning – Succession (2021) – creator, chief director, character designer, series composition
- Love Through a Prism (2026) – director

=== Video games ===
- Le Roman de la Reine (1998) – character designer
- Tales of Legendia (2005) – character designer
- Asura's Wrath (2012) – director & main character designer (ep 15.5)

=== Music videos ===
- Linkin Park - Breaking the Habit (2004) – director
- ASIAN KUNG-FU GENERATION - Atarashii Sekai (2008) – director
- supercell - Utakata Hanabi (2010) – director

== Bibliography ==
- El Hazard: The Magnificent World Setting Collection (神秘の世界エルハザード 設定資料集). AIC, 1996. ISBN 978-4900817081
- El-Hazard: The Wanderers Setting Collection (神秘の世界エルハザード TVシリーズ 設定資料集). AIC, 1997. ISBN 978-4900817128
- Tenchi in Tokyo Setting Collection (新 天地無用! 設定資料集). AIC, 1998. ISBN 978-4900817166
- Roman Album: Samurai Champloo. Dark Horse, 2007. ISBN 978-1593076429
- Top Creators Teach How to Characters (トップクリエイターが教えるキャラクターの創り方『サムライチャンプルー』『エルゴプラクシー』にみるアニメーション制作現場). MC Press, 2007. ISBN 978-4901972949
- B: The Beginning Artworks (B: The Beginning アートワークス). PIE International, 2019. ISBN 978-4756251848
