= Ani*Kuri15 =

Short subject anime television series

- The DVD cover

アニ＊クリ15 (Ani*Kuri15)
- Genre: Adventure; Music video Short subject
- Anime television series
- Directed by: Shinji Kimura, Yasufumi Soejima, Osamu Kobayashi, Shōjirō Nishimi, Mamoru Oshii, Kazuto Nakazawa, Range Murata Range Murata, Tatsuya Yabuta, Atsushi Takeuchi, Tobira Oda, Yasuyuki Shimizu, Makoto Shinkai, Mahiro Maeda, Michael Arias, Shōji Kawamori, and Satoshi Kon
- Studio: Studio 4°C, Gainax, Gonzo, Madhouse, Production I.G
- Original network: NHK
- Original run: 2007 – 2008
- Episodes: 15

Ani*Kuri15 (アニ＊クリ15) is a series of fifteen 1-minute animated shorts, broadcast by NHK between May 2007 and 2008. Intended as companion pieces to the Ani*Kuri program and as filler between regularly scheduled programs, the shorts were broadcast in three seasons of 5 episodes. Each short was directed by a different director and the episodes were collected and uploaded to the official Ani*Kuri15 website in 2008.

== Episodes ==
=== Season 1 ===
- "Attack of Higashimachi 2nd Borough" (Shinji Kimura: Studio 4°C) - Three aliens come to a cardboard Earth to invade.
- "From the Other Side of the Tears" ("Namida no Mukou") (Akemi Hayashi: Gainax) - A sad young girl recovers from a heartache.
- "Blaze Man" ("Hyotoko") (Yasufumi Soejima: Gonzo) - A group of native warriors attack a giant kami in the shape of a bear. The kami sets one of the warriors on fire spiritually.
- "Sancha (The Aromatic Tea) Blues" (Osamu Kobayashi: Madhouse) - An avaricious record-store owner watches greedily as patrons look through his records.
- "Invasion from Space - Hiroshi's Case" ("Uchujin Raikou Hiroshi no Baai") (Shōjirō Nishimi: Studio 4°C) - Hiroshi tries to read his manga but a small robot is shooting pellets to distract him so the robot can escape.

=== Season 2 ===
- "Project Mermaid" (Mamoru Oshii: Production I.G) - A fish turns into a mermaid who swims out into post-apocalyptic city.
- "Yurururu ~Nichijou Hen~" (Kazuto Nakazawa: Studio 4°C) - An animator spends the whole day animating a 1-second clip of a giant fish in a city.
- "Gyrosopter" (Range Murata and Tatsuya Yabuta: Gonzo) - A young gyrosopter pilot visits a pool of water and remembers a gyrosopter battle and the death of a friend on a watery planet.
- "Wandaba Kiss" (Atsushi Takeuchi: Production I.G) - A young boy and his dog initiate a complex Rube Goldberg machine in order to steal a kiss from a young girl.
- "Supaatsu Taisa" ("刺客來搜山了", Colonel Sports) (Tobira Oda and Yasuyuki Shimizu: Studio 4°C) - A superhero comic book character and Tomoo's idol from Tobira Oda's manga, Danchi Tomoo. He has his meal stolen by a cat after being attacked by a villain (his master's daughter). Then he imagines his master (Paul) scaring the cats. Then he falls into a river, and is chased by his sidekick (The Bear and The Crow) and drifts over a waterfall.

=== Season 3 ===
- "A Gathering of Cats" ("Neko no Shuukai") (Makoto Shinkai: CoMix Wave Films) - The family cat (Chobi) has had his tail stepped on one too many times and dreams of revenge.
- "Princess Onmitsu" ("Onmitsu Hime") (Mahiro Maeda: Gonzo) - A magical girl and her doll must defeat an invading horde of air pirates.
- "Okkakekko" (Michael Arias: Studio 4°C) - A group of children run across fields and play with a giant scary robot.
- "Project Omega" (Shōji Kawamori: Satelight) - As an alien force hurtles toward NHK headquarters in Tokyo, the NHK building springs to life as an evangelion-transformer to battle the foe.
- "Good Morning" ("Ohayō") (Satoshi Kon: Madhouse) - A young girl gets up from bed and sleepily tries to awaken herself.

== See also ==
- Genius Party
- Japan Animator Expo
- Young Animator Training Project
