= Noiseman Sound Insect =

- Directed by: Koji Morimoto
- Screenplay by: Hideo Morinaka
- Story by: Studio 4°C
- Edited by: Hiroshi Adachi
- Music by: Yōko Kanno
- Distributed by: Bandai Visual
- Release date: November 22, 1997
- Running time: 14 minutes
- Country: Japan
- Language: Japanese

Noiseman Sound Insect (音響生命体ノイズマン, Onkyo Seimeitai Noiseman) is a short anime film directed by Koji Morimoto, with production by Studio 4°C and music by Yoko Kanno featuring a young Crystal Kay Williams singing the ending theme.

It was released in Japan on November 22, 1997. On October 28, 2022, Studio 4°C made an announcement that the film is online on YouTube worldwide (except Japan) until November 18th, for the first time in HD.

This short was aired on Locomotion for Latin America and Iberia in its Locotomía block.

== Plot ==
In a world of music and musical plants, a mad scientist is experimenting with the seeds of those plants to create a child, Noiseman. After giving Noiseman a potion to grow faster the scientist couldn't control him anymore and accidentally split his body into a ghost and a crystal with a machine of his. Noiseman is now in control of the whole city, brainwashing people to capture those ghosts and telling the people that the music fruit is forbidden. Tobio who also was brainwashed got hit by a music fruit and remembered the past, where everyone would enjoy the music. He tries to convince Noiseman that his doing is wrong and that he should return the captured ghosts to their crystals but without success. Now the underground people are trying their best to help the ghosts with the help of Tobio's childhood friend.

== Release history ==
International publication date
Country	Title	Date
Japan	音響生命体ノイズマン	22 November 1997; 5 December 2003 (video release)
South Korea	Noiseman Sound Insect	September 1998 (Busan International Film Festival)
France	Noiseman Sound Insect	June 1999 (Annecy Film Festival)
