= Kōji Morimoto =

Japanese anime director

- 森本晃司
- Born: Wakayama, Japan
- Occupations: Director, animator

Kōji Morimoto (森本晃司, Morimoto Kōji) is a Japanese anime director. Some of his works include being an animator for film Akira; and animator for shorts in Robot Carnival, Short Peace, and The Animatrix; and key animation in anime such as Kiki's Delivery Service, City Hunter, and Fist of the North Star. He is the co-founder of Studio 4°C. He has hosted the independent creative team "phy" since 2009.

== Biography ==
Born in Wakayama, Japan, he graduated from the Osaka Designers' College in 1979 and a couple of years later joined the studio Annapuru as an animator for the TV series Tomorrow's Joe. While working there, he saw some animation by Takashi Nakamura in Gold Lightan, an otherwise standard mecha TV series by a rival studio. He was impressed, and it inspired him to quit his job and become a freelance animator.

Morimoto often collaborated with Nakamura, most notably in Katsuhiro Otomo's "The Order to Stop Construction" segment of the anthology film Neo-Tokyo. This opened many doors for him, from working as animation director on Otomo's landmark feature Akira and a chance to direct a short for the Robot Carnival anthology. Around this time he founded Studio 4°C with producer Eiko Tanaka and fellow animator Yoshiharu Sato.

Since then, Morimoto has focused almost exclusively on his directing work. His work became increasingly unusual with time. This is best represented by the concert scenes in Macross Plus and his short film Noiseman Sound Insect.

Aside from a small cult following, his films have been ignored outside Japan. This has begun to change in recent years, with his artwork being featured in Takashi Murakami's Superflat exhibitions worldwide, the Proto Anime Cut exhibition, and was invited by The Wachowskis to direct "Beyond", a segment of The Animatrix. He is currently working on Sachiko, his second feature-length film.

== Filmography ==
=== Film ===
- Robot Carnival (1987) – "Franken's Gears"
- Akira (Assistant Animation Director, 1988)
- Fly! Peek the Whale (とべ!くじらのピーク, Tobe! Kujira no Peek) (1991)
- Ai Monogatari: 9 Love Stories (1991) – "Hero"
- Open the Door (トビラを開けて, Tobira o Akete) (1995)
- Memories (1995) – "Magnetic Rose"
- Noiseman Sound Insect (1997)
- Eternal Family (1997)
- Jigen Loop (2001)
- The Animatrix (2003) – "Beyond"
- Digital Juice (2003) – "The Saloon in the Air"
- Mind Game (2004)
- Genius Party Beyond (2008) – "Dimension Bomb"
- Short Peace (2013) – Opening Sequence
- Sturgill Simpson Presents SOUND & FURY (2019) – "Mercury in Retrograde"

=== TV ===
- Lupin the 3rd Part IV: The Italian Adventure (2016) – Opening Animation
- 18if (2016) – Episode 10, "Dream Dimension α"
- Rinishii!! Ekoda Chan (2019) – Episode 12

=== Music videos ===
- KEN ISHII – "EXTRA" (1996)
- The Bluetones – "4-Day Weekend" (1998)
- Glay – "Survival" (サバイバル, Sabaibaru) (1999)
- Hikaru Utada – "You Make Me Want to Be a Man" (2005)
- Hikaru Utada – "Passion" (2005)
- Mono – Promotional Short Film for Rays of Darkness & The Last Dawn (2014)

=== Other ===
- Lexus Short Films – "A Better Tomorrow" Animation Sequence (2013) (short film directed by Hikari)
- Sheepman012: The Man of Multiplication (2014) – Live Stage Play with Mushirase Theater Company
- Magic: The Gathering 25th Anniversary Exhibition – "φ (Phy)" (2018)
- JVCKenwood Promotional Short Film – "CONNECTED ..." (2020) (Collaboration with Mamoru Oshii)
