= Studio 4°C =

Japanese animation studio

Studio 4°C Co., Ltd.
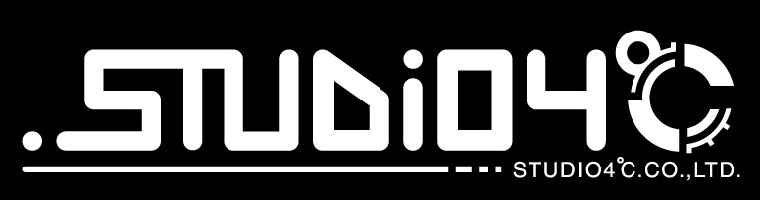
- Native name: 株式会社STUDIO 4°C
- Industry: Animation studio
- Founded: 1986; 40 years ago
- Founder: Eiko Tanaka
- Headquarters: Kichjoji Kitamachi, Musashino, Tokyo, Japan
- Key people: Eiko Tanaka (president); Kōji Morimoto (director, animator)
- Products: Anime (television, film, OVA)
- Website: studio4c.co.jp

Studio 4°C Co., Ltd. (株式会社STUDIO 4°C, Kabushiki-Gaisha Sutajio Yondo Shī; stylized as STUDIO4°C) is a Japanese independent animation studio founded by Eiko Tanaka and Kōji Morimoto in 1986. The name comes from the temperature at which water is most dense.

== History ==
Studio 4°C has produced numerous feature films, OVAs, and shorts. Early film titles include Memories (1995), Spriggan (1998), and Princess Arete (2001). In 2003, through a joint production with Warner Bros., Studio 4°C created five segments of The Animatrix. The following year, they created the award-winning avant-garde film Mind Game. Studio 4°C's next film Tekkon Kinkreet (2006), won six awards, including Best Animated Film at the Fantasia 2007, Lancia Platinum Grand Prize at the Future Film Festival, and Japan Academy Prize for Animation of the Year. It was also submitted for 2007 Oscar in Animated Feature Film category of Academy Award in USA.

The year 2007 saw the release of the anthology film Genius Party, a collection of seven short films. Genius Party Beyond, a collection of five short films, was released the following year, as was Batman's side story Gotham Knight, and the OVA series Detroit Metal City. The following year First Squad: The Moment of Truth was awarded at the Moscow International Film Festival. In February 2010, they contributed two shorts to the anthology Halo Legends: "Origins", and "The Babysitter".

== Works ==
=== Feature films ===
- Memories (1995)
- Spriggan (1998)
- Princess Arete (2001)
- Mind Game (2004)
- Tekkonkinkreet (2006)
- First Squad: The Moment of Truth (2009)
- Berserk: Golden Age Arc
  - The Egg of the King (2012)
  - The Battle for Doldrey (2012)
  - The Advent (2013)
- Harmony (2015, part of the Project Itoh trilogy)
- Mutafukaz (2017, with Ankama Animations)
- Children of the Sea (2019)
- Poupelle of Chimney Town (2020)
- Champion island (2021)
- Fortune Favors Lady Nikuko (2021)
- ChaO (2025)
- All You Need Is Kill (2026)

=== TV series ===
- Macross 7 (1994, opening animation)
- Piroppo (2001)
- Tweeny Witches (2004)
- Kimagure Robot (2004)
- Ani*Kuri15 (2007)
- Transformers: Animated (2007; with The Answer Studio and Mook Animation)
- ThunderCats (2011) (co-produced with Warner Bros. Animation)
- Chiisana Hana no Uta (2013)
- Future Kid Takara (2025)
- SWAT Kats: Revolution (TBA) (co-produced with Warner Bros. Animation and Toonz Entertainment)

=== OVA / ONA ===
- Noiseman Sound Insect (1997)
- Eternal Family (1997)
- Uraroji Diamond (2000)
- The Animatrix – "Kid's Story", "The Second Renaissance", "Beyond", "A Detective Story" (2003)
- Hijikata Toshizo: Shiro no Kiseki (2004)
- Tweeny Witches: The Adventures (2007)
- Batman: Gotham Knight (2008)
  - Have I Got A Story For You
  - Working Through Pain
- Detroit Metal City (2008)
- Street Fighter IV – The Ties That Bind (2009)
- Halo Legends (2010)
  - The Babysitter
  - Origins
- Green Lantern: Emerald Knights (2011)
- Justice League: The Flashpoint Paradox (2013)
- Kuro no Sumika - Chronus - (Young Animator Training Project, 2014)
- Phoenix: Eden17 (2023)

=== Music videos ===
- Ken Ishii – "Extra" (1996)
- The Bluetones – "Four Day Weekend" (1998)
- Glay – "Survival" (1999)
- "Brand New Day" (ミュージッククリップ「BRAND NEW DAY」監督：新井浩一) (2001, Unreleased)
- Ayumi Hamasaki – "Connected" (2002)
- Ligalize – "Pervyi Otryad" ("First Squad") (2005)
- Hikaru Utada - "Fluximation" (2005) (for Exodus)
- Hikaru Utada – "Passion" (2006) (Square Enix's Kingdom Hearts II Theme song)

=== Short films ===
- Gondora (1998)
- Digital Juice (2001)
- Jigen Loop (2001)
- Sweat Punch (5 short films, 2001–2002. Collected and released on DVD in 2007) – "Professor Dan Petory's Blues", "End of the World", "Comedy", "Beyond", and "Junk Town".
- Amazing Nuts! (4 short films - "Global Astroliner", "Glass Eye", "Kung Fu Love – Even If You Become the Enemy of the World", "Joe and Marilyn", released exclusively on DVD as a collaboration with Rhythm Zone in 2006)
- Tamala's "Wild Party" (2007)
- Genius Party (July 7, 2007) A collection of 7 short films
- Genius Party Beyond (February 15, 2008) A collection of 5 short films
- The Babysitter (2009) A Halo Legends short portraying the relationship between the Spartans and the ODSTs
- Orion (2010)
- My Last Day (2011) – Created in association with The JESUS Film Project, Brethren Entertainment, and Barry Cook
- Kid Icarus: Uprising – "Medusa's Revenge" (2012) – Promotional short for Kid Icarus: Uprising video game
- Drive Your Heart (2013) Spin-off to PES-peace eco smile, short film produced to advertise Toyota
- Tuzuki: Love Assassin (2014)
- Turnover (2015) adaptation from the manga of the same name, for advertising purpose for Benesse
- Kanjo ga Kanji o Sukina Riyū Part 1 and Part 2 (2015)
- Red Ash: Gearworld (2017)

=== Video games ===
- Ace Combat 04: Shattered Skies (2001)
- Tube Slider (2003)
- Summon Night 3 (2003)
- Ape Escape: Pumped & Primed (2004)
- Ace Combat 5: The Unsung War (2004)
- Rogue Galaxy (2005)
- Lunar Knights (2006)
- Jeanne D'Arc (2006)
- Ace Combat X: Skies of Deception (2006)
- Street Fighter IV (2008)
- .hack//Link (2010)
- Zack & Ombra: The Phantom Amusement Park (2010)
- Catherine (2011)
- Hard Corps: Uprising (2011)
- Asura's Wrath (2012)
- Toukiden (2013)
- Tokyo Mirage Sessions ♯FE (2015)
- Guardian's Violation (2015)
- Doodle Champion Island Games (2021)

=== Commercials ===
- Capcom - Mega Man Zero commercial (2002)
- Namco - Klonoa Heroes: Densetsu no Star Medal commercial (2002)
- Nike – LeBron James In Chamber of Fear (Self Doubt) (2004)
- Honda Edix presents Edix Six – kiro (2006)

=== Other ===
- Kamikaze Girls (2004) – Animated segment
- Lincoln (2005) – Opening animation and character designs
- Kurosagi (2006) – Opening animation
- Donju (2009) – Animated segment
- My Last Day (2011) – A short Easter anime Campus Crusade for Christ
- PES-peace eco smile (2012) – Series of shorts produced to advertise Toyota
- The Amazing World of Gumball (2016) – Dragon Ball manga-style flashback sequence and Kill la Kill-style fight sequence between Nicole and Masami's mother, Yuki for the season four episode "The Fury"
- Ballmastrz: Rubicon (2023) — A TV special
