= The Animatrix =

2003 American-Japanese-South Korean anthology anime film

Japanese name
- Kanji: アニマトリックス
Transcriptions
- Revised Hepburn: Animatorikkusu
- Directed by: Andy Jones; Mahiro Maeda; Shinichirō Watanabe; Yoshiaki Kawajiri; Takeshi Koike; Kōji Morimoto; Peter Chung
- Written by: The Wachowskis (Note: Credited as Larry and Andy Wachowski); Mahiro Maeda; Shinichirō Watanabe; Yoshiaki Kawajiri; Kōji Morimoto; Peter Chung
- Produced by: The Wachowskis
- Segment producers: Michael Arias; Hiroaki Takeuchi; Eiko Tanaka
- Music by: Don Davis; Junkie XL
- Animation by: Square Pictures (Note: Final Flight of the Osiris); Madhouse (Note: Program, World Record); Studio 4°C (Note: The Second Renaissance, Kid's Story, Beyond, A Detective Story); DNA Productions (Note: Matriculated)
- Production companies: Village Roadshow Pictures; NPV Entertainment
- Distributed by: Warner Home Video (Note: Credited as Warner Bros. Pictures in the VHS release)
- Release date: June 3, 2003
- Running time: 102 minutes
- Countries: United States; South Korea; Japan
- Languages: English; Japanese

The Animatrix (Japanese: アニマトリックス, Hepburn: Animatorikkusu) is a 2003 adult animated science fiction anthology film produced by the Wachowskis. It includes nine animated short films, some of which provide backstory for The Matrix film series, while others present side stories. The Animatrix was released by Warner Home Video on June 3, 2003.

== Plot ==
=== Final Flight of the Osiris ===
Captain Thadeus and Jue engage in a blindfolded sword fight in a virtual reality dojo. They do not harm each other, only damage clothing. At some point, they are interrupted by an alarm, and the simulation ends.

In the next scene, the hovercraft Osiris heads for Junction 21 when operator Robbie discovers an army of Sentinels on his HR scans. The ship flees into an uncharted tunnel, where it encounters a small group of Sentinels patrolling the area. The crew members man the onboard guns and destroy the patrol. The ship emerges on the surface, four kilometers directly above Zion and close to the Sentinel army. Thadeus and Jue see the Machines using gigantic drills to tunnel down to Zion. The Sentinel army detects the Osiris and pursues the ship.

Thadeus realizes and decides that Zion must be warned, and Jue volunteers to broadcast herself into the Matrix to deliver the warning while the ship is doggedly pursued. Knowing that neither of them will make it out alive, Thadeus and Jue admit to each other about peeking in the simulation before kissing farewell. Entering the Matrix, Jue eventually reaches a mailbox where she drops off a package; this sets up the prologue for the video game Enter the Matrix. She attempts to contact Thadeus via cell phone as the Osiris is overrun by Sentinels and crashes. The Sentinels tear their way into the ship, where Thadeus makes a last stand against the Sentinels. Shortly after Jue realizes the horror of the situation, she says "Thadeus" over her cell phone immediately before the Osiris explodes, destroying many of the Sentinels and killing the entire crew. In the Matrix, Jue falls to the ground, dead, after her body is destroyed on the ship.

=== The Second Renaissance, Part I ===
Narrated by the machines' archives, the film shows humanity developing artificial intelligence in the mid-21st century and thereafter building an entire race of sentient servant robots. Many of the robots are domestic servants meant to interact with humans, so they are built in a humanoid form. With increasing numbers of people released from all labor, much of the human population has become slothful, conceited, and corrupt. Despite this, the machines are content to serve humanity.

The relationship between humans and machines begins to sour in the year 2090, when a domestic android is threatened by its owner. The android, named B1-66ER, kills its owner, his pets, and a mechanic instructed to deactivate B1-66ER, which is the first incident of a robot killing a human. B1-66ER is arrested and put on trial, but states the crime was self-defense, explaining that it did not want to die. The prosecution argues that machines are not entitled to the same rights as humans and that humans have a right to destroy their property. The defense urges the viewer of the film not to repeat history and to judge B1-66ER as a human and not a machine. B1-66ER loses the court case and is destroyed. Across the industrialized world, mass civil disturbances erupt when robots and their human sympathizers rise in protest. Rioting and protests unfold across the United States and Europe, and the authorities use deadly force against the machines and their human supporters.

Fearing a robot rebellion and a schism with humanity, governments worldwide launch a mass purge to destroy all robots. Millions of robots are demolished with some of their human allies purged, but the survivors lead an exodus alongside their supporters to a new nation in the desert, named Zero One. The nation prospers, and its technological sophistication increases swiftly. The machines produce highly advanced artificial intelligence that ends up in a multitude of global consumer products. Their economy flourishes, while the economies of the ruling human nations suffer and decline. Eventually, the global industry becomes concentrated in Zero One, which leads to a global stock market crash.

The United Nations Security Council calls an emergency summit to discuss an embargo and military blockade of Zero One. The machines send ambassadors requesting admission of their state to the United Nations to resolve the crisis peacefully, but their request is rejected, and the human nations agree to begin the blockade.

=== The Second Renaissance, Part II ===
In 2148, following the rest of humanity's refusal to share the planet with the machines, the United Nations unleashes an all-out nuclear bombardment against Zero One; devastating the nation yet failing to destroy its inhabitants who are immune to the radiation, unlike humans. The machines respond by declaring war on the rest of humanity and, one by one, the human nations surrender.

The desperate leaders of humanity pursue a drastic solution codenamed "Operation Dark Storm", which shrouds the sky in darkness, blocking out the sun and depriving the machines of solar energy. Under the darkness, humanity continues to fight a ground war against the machines; but their onslaught stalls as Zero One deploys new, more advanced robots. Seeing the machines as their only hope of surviving, the human supporters of the machine nation offer themselves as an alternate power source with their bioelectric energy. After careful consideration, the machines accept this as a show of their union. The machines also begin using human prisoners of war for additional bioelectric power. The desperate human leaders then order nuclear weapons fired upon the machines, destroying many of their own troops in the process; this causes the human armies to become disillusioned with their leaders and allow themselves to be taken by the machines, ignoring their leaders' furious demands to continue the war. Overwhelmed, the remaining human government leaders surrender. At the UN headquarters, the representative of Zero One signs the terms of surrender; then detonates a thermonuclear bomb, destroying the headquarters, New York City, and the last of humanity's leadership.

The machines are now the masters of a burnt-out husk of a world. They build massive bioelectric power plants that use humans as living batteries. To keep the prisoners sedated, the machines create the computer-generated virtual reality of the Matrix, which feeds a virtual world straight into the prisoners' brains.

=== Kid's Story ===
Kid's Story takes place during the six-month gap between The Matrix and The Matrix Reloaded, during which Neo has joined the crew of the Nebuchadnezzar and is helping the rebels free other humans from the Matrix. The Kid, formerly known as Michael Karl Popper, is a disaffected teenager who feels that something is wrong with the world. One night, the Kid goes on his computer and onto a hacker chat room on the Internet, asking why it feels more real when he's dreaming than when he's awake. He receives a response from an unknown person (presumably Neo), then asks who it is and whether he is alone.

The next day at school, he absent-mindedly scribbles Neo and Trinity's names and writes "get me out of here" in his notebook. He receives a call from Neo on his cell phone, who warns him that a group of Agents is coming for him, and he is chased throughout the high school before ultimately being cornered on the roof. He calmly asserts his faith in Neo and throws himself off the roof. At the Kid's funeral, among the people is his teacher, who converses with another school staff member and says that the world they live in is not real and the real world is somewhere else. He also says that reality can be scary, that the world must have been a harmful place for the Kid, and that, at the very least, he is now in a better world.

The next scene fades out as the Kid awakens in the real world, only to find Neo and Trinity watching over him. They remark that he has achieved "self-substantiation" (removing oneself from the Matrix without external aid), which was considered impossible. In both the scene and The Matrix Reloaded, the Kid believes Neo saved him, but Neo tells him he saved himself. The last scene shows the Kid's last question on the hacker chat room being answered with "You are not alone."

=== Program ===
Program follows the protagonist, Cis, who is engaged in her favorite training simulation: a battle program set in feudal Japan. After she successfully eliminates an attacking enemy cavalry unit while playing as a samurai woman, a lone male samurai appears, whom Cis recognizes as Duo.

Initially, the two duel as allies to test one another's fighting abilities. During the course of their duel, Duo briefly disarms Cis. He questions her concentration and wonders whether she regrets taking the Red Pill that took them out of the "peaceful life of the virtual world". They continue fighting until she finally overpowers Duo. At this point, Duo states that he has something he wants to say and that he has blocked the signal so the operator does not listen. She assumes he wants to propose marriage, but instead learns he wants to return to the Matrix and has Cis come with him. When Cis believes he is teasing her, Duo says he's serious and states that he has already contacted the machines, which is the only way to find peace before it is too late. He urges Cis to return with him, but she refuses. Duo becomes more aggressive and forceful in his arguments, saying that he no longer cares about the truth and that how they live their lives is important because what is real does not matter. As Cis grows incredulous, their battle intensifies, and they both end up on a rooftop.

When Duo reiterates that the machines are on their way, Cis believes he has betrayed the humans and decides that she needs to do something about it outside the simulation. Terrified, she tries to escape and desperately requests an operator to exit the simulation, but Duo reminds her that no one can hear her. When he offers her to come with him again, she refuses again, and Duo, in a flying leap, tries to attack her. As the blade comes towards her, Cis, standing her ground, concentrates and catches the sword and breaks it. She takes the broken end of the blade and stabs Duo directly in the throat, killing him. Remorseful, Duo states his love for her as he bleeds out and dies.

Suddenly, Cis wakes up from the program and discovers that the entire encounter with Duo was a training program. A man named Kaiser assures her that she acted appropriately during the test and met the test's targets. Clearly upset and traumatized by the realization that Duo wasn't real, Cis angrily punches him in the face and walks away. Shocked and impressed by her behavior, Kaiser remarks that "except from that last part, I'd say she passed."

=== World Record ===
The beginning of this short includes a brief narration from the Instructor (implying that this segment is a Zion Archive file) explaining details behind the discovery of the Matrix by "plugged-in" humans. Only exceptional humans tend to become aware of the Matrix, those who have "a rare degree of intuition, sensitivity, and a questioning nature", all qualities which are used to identify inconsistencies in the Matrix. This is not without exceptions, given that "some attain this wisdom through wholly different means."

The story is about Dan Davis, a track athlete competing in the 100 m at the Summer Olympic Games. He has set a world record time of 8.99 seconds, but his subsequent gold medal was revoked due to alleged drug use. He decides to compete again and break his own record to "prove them wrong." Despite support from his father and a young reporter, Dan's trainer tells him that he is physically unfit to race and that pushing himself too hard will cause a career-ending injury or worse. Despite this, Dan is adamant.

On the day of the race, he is monitored by four Agents in the stadium. The race begins, and Dan starts strong; however, the muscles in his leg violently rupture, setting him back and scaring many people in the stands, including his trainer. With strong willpower, Dan ignores the injury and runs much faster than before, easily passing the other athletes. Before he can cross the finish line, the Agents detect that his "signal" is getting unstable in the Matrix due to his massive burst of energy. Three of the Agents possess the three closest runners and try to stop him, but are unable to catch up to him in time.

The burst of energy suddenly unplugs Dan from the Matrix and wakes him in his power-station pod, where he sees the real world through it. A Sentinel employs electrical restraints to secure him back in his pod. Dan's mind is immediately thrown back into the Matrix, where his body is instantly exhausted from the race, and Dan violently collapses to the ground at high speed. Despite this, he easily wins the race and breaks his previous time of 8.99 seconds, finishing in 8.72 seconds. The next scene shows a crippled and catatonic Dan being wheeled through a hospital. A nearby Agent calls his other Agents to tell them they erased Dan's memory of the race and that he will never walk again and will not be an issue for them. However, Dan suddenly whispers the word "Free", angering the Agent. Dan then stands, breaking the metal screws that bind his restraints to his wheelchair, and takes a few steps before helplessly falling and being helped up by a nurse.

=== Beyond ===
Beyond follows a 14-year-old girl, Yoko, looking for her cat, Yuki. While asking around the neighborhood, somewhere in a megacity resembling Tokyo, she meets a group of young boys. One of them tells her that Yuki is inside a nearby haunted house where they usually play.

The haunted house is an old, run-down building filled with an amalgamation of anomalies, which are revealed to be glitches in the Matrix, that the children have stumbled across. They have learned to exploit them for their own enjoyment in several areas that seem to defy real-world physics. The boys play with glass bottles that reassemble after being shattered, and they enter a large open space in the middle of the building that creates a zero-gravity effect. Meanwhile, as Yoko searches for Yuki throughout the building, she encounters some anomalies on her own: She goes through an area where broken lightbulbs flicker briefly (during which they seem intact), walks into a room where rain is falling from a sunny sky, and goes down a hallway where a gust of wind appears and disappears. She finally finds Yuki outside on a concrete pavement, where she sees shadows that do not align with their physical origins. Yoko then joins the boys in the open space, where she sees a dove feather spinning rapidly in mid-air and experiences zero gravity as she slowly and safely falls to the ground. She and the boys start using the zero-gravity force to float, jump high, and do athletic stunts all in mid-air, and can also land without hitting the ground hard. Despite the place's inherent strangeness, the group is not bothered by it, as they enjoy themselves and find the mysterious anomaly amusing.

Throughout the film, brief sequences show that Agents are aware of the problem in the Matrix, and a truck is seen driving toward the site to presumably address it. It arrives just as the children are having trouble with a large group of rats, and an Agent-led team of rodent exterminators emerges from the truck. In the building, when Yoko finds Yuki again, she sees one last anomaly: she opens a door that leads into an endless dark void before being found by the exterminators. The team clears everybody out of the building. The story ends when Yoko returns to the area the next day and finds the site turned into an unremarkable parking lot. She sees the boys unsuccessfully attempt to recreate the bizarre events of the day before and go in search of something else to do.

=== A Detective Story ===
This prequel story follows a private detective, Ash, who dreamed of following in the steps of hard-boiled characters Sam Spade and Philip Marlowe but is a down-on-his-luck detective. One day, he receives an anonymous phone call to search for a hacker going by the alias "Trinity". Ash starts looking for Trinity and learns that other detectives have failed in the same task before him; one committed suicide, one went missing, and one went insane.

Eventually, Ash finds Trinity after deducing that he should communicate using phrases and facts from Lewis Carroll's Alice's Adventures in Wonderland. She proposes a meeting, and he finds her on a passenger train. When he meets her, she removes a "bug" from his eye, planted by Agents earlier in an "eye exam," which Ash previously thought was a dream. Three Agents immediately appear and attempt to apprehend Trinity in a shoot-out with her and Ash. While the two are trying to escape, an Agent attempts to take over Ash's body, forcing Trinity to shoot him to prevent the Agent from completing his possession. Ash is wounded and bleeding, whereupon he and Trinity amicably bid farewell. Trinity tells Ash that she genuinely thinks he could have handled the truth as she jumps out of a window and escapes. The Agents enter the train to find Ash, who calmly points his gun at them while looking in the other direction and lighting a cigarette. The Agents turn to Ash, who, even though he is armed, will likely die regardless of what they do with him. With this apparent no-win situation, the film ends with Ash's line, "A case to end all cases," as his lighter flame goes out.

=== Matriculated ===
The film deals with a group of above-ground human rebels who lure hostile machines to their laboratory to capture them and insert them into a "Matrix" of their own design. Within this Matrix, humans attempt to teach the captured machines some of humanity's positive traits, primarily compassion and empathy. They hope that, once converted of its own volition, an "enlightened" machine will willingly assist Zion in its struggle against the machine-controlled totalitarianism which currently dominates the Earth.

The film starts with a human woman, Alexa, looking out over the sea, watching for incoming machines, where she sees two "runners," one of the most intelligent robots, approaching. She leads them into the laboratory, where one runner gets ambushed and killed by a reprogrammed robot, but the second runner kills the robot before Alexa electrocutes it, knocking out the runner. The rebels insert the runner into their Matrix. The robot experiences moments of mystery, horror, wonder, and excitement, leading it to believe it may have an emotional bond with Alexa.

However, the laboratory is attacked by Sentinel reinforcements. The rebels unplug themselves to defend their headquarters, aided by other captured machines. Alexa unplugs the runner, which has now turned good, saving her from a machine. The rebels and the attacking machines are all killed or destroyed, except for the runner. The robot plugs the dying Alexa and itself into the rebels' Matrix. When Alexa realizes she is trapped in the Matrix with the runner, she is horrified, and her avatar screams and dissolves as the runner exits the rebels' Matrix to find a dead Alexa in the real world. The film ends with the "converted" runner standing outside, looking out over the sea, in a replica of the opening shot with Alexa.

== Production ==
Development of the Animatrix began when the creators of the Matrix film series, The Wachowskis, were in Japan promoting the first Matrix film. They met with the creators of some of the anime films that had influenced their work, and decided to collaborate with them. The Wachowskis wrote four of the Animatrix films but did not direct any of the animation; most of the project's technical side was overseen by notable Japanese animators. The English-language version of The Animatrix was directed by Jack Fletcher, who recruited voice actors from Final Fantasy X, including Matt McKenzie, James Arnold Taylor, John DiMaggio, Tara Strong, Hedy Burress, and Dwight Schultz. Other voice actors include Victor Williams, Melinda Clarke, Olivia d'Abo, Pamela Adlon, and Kevin Michael Richardson. The characters Neo, Trinity, and Kid are voiced by their original actors from the live-action films: Keanu Reeves, Carrie-Anne Moss, and Clayton Watson, respectively.

== Release ==
Poster advertising the home video release of The Animatrix

Four of the Animatrix films made their debut on the official Matrix website. Final Flight of the Osiris was shown in theaters with the film Dreamcatcher. The other films were first released on the VHS and DVD editions of The Animatrix on June 3, 2003. The DVD also includes audio commentaries, a documentary on Japanese animation, and seven featurettes with interviews and behind-the-scenes footage.

Shortly after the home video release, The Animatrix was shown at the New York-Tokyo Film Festival on June 14, 2003, in New York City. It was broadcast on the U.S. television programming block Adult Swim on April 17, 2004, to promote the DVD release of The Matrix Revolutions, and on the Toonami programming block on December 19, 2021, to promote The Matrix Resurrections. The Animatrix was broadcast on the Canadian network Teletoon several months after its initial American broadcast. In the United Kingdom, Final Flight of the Osiris was broadcast on Channel 5 just before the DVD release. The Second Renaissance Parts 1 and 2, Kid's Story and World Record were broadcast on Channel 5 after the DVD release. The Animatrix was screened for one night only at the Japan Society in New York City on May 27, 2022.

== Reception ==
The Animatrix sold 2.7 million copies, grossing $68 million in sales revenue. On the review aggregator website Rotten Tomatoes, 88% of 17 critics' reviews are positive, with an average rating of 6.7/10. In her 2009 book 500 Essential Anime Movies, Helen McCarthy stated that "unlike many heavily promoted franchise movies, [The Animatrix] justifies its hype". She said Maeda's Second Renaissance "foreshadows the dazzling visual inventiveness of his later Gankutsuou ".

The Animatrix entry in The Encyclopedia of Science Fiction notes that "The films, all interesting and some very strong indeed, vary widely in style, subject, degree of connection to the Matrix spinal narrative, and authorial control by the Wachowski siblings themselves; they are probably the most rewarding elements of the ambitious but largely disappointing sequel rollout".

== Credits ==
=== Voice cast ===
Role	English	Japanese
Final Flight of the Osiris
Thadeus	Kevin Michael Richardson	Akio Ōtsuka
Jue	Pamela Adlon	Atsuko Yuya
Crew Man	John DiMaggio	
Operator	Tom Kenny	
Pilot	Rick Gomez	
Crew Woman	Tara Strong	
Old Woman	Bette Ford	Miyoko Asō
The Second Renaissance
The Instructor	Julia Fletcher	Rika Fukami
01 Versatran Spokesman	Dane Davis	Masashi Sugawara
Kid	Debi Derryberry	
Mother	Jill Talley	
Additional voices	Dwight Schultz; James Arnold Taylor; Jill Talley	
Kid's Story
The Kid	Clayton Watson	Hikaru Midorikawa
Neo	Keanu Reeves	Hiroaki Hirata
Trinity	Carrie-Anne Moss	Hiromi Tsuru
Teacher	John DeMita	Fumihiko Tachiki
Cop	Kevin Michael Richardson	Yusaku Yara
Additional voices	James Arnold Taylor	
Program
Cis	Hedy Buress	Kaho Kouda
Duo	Phil LaMarr	Toshiyuki Morikawa
Kaiser	John DiMaggio	Shinji Ogawa
World Record
Narrator	Julia Fletcher	
Dan	Victor Williams	Hiroki Tōchi
Dan's Dad	John Wesley	Kinryū Arimoto
Tom	Alex Fernandez	Mitsuru Miyamoto
Reporter	Allison Smith	Atsuko Tanaka
Nurse	Tara Strong	Sayaka Kobayashi
Agent #1	Matt McKenzie	Unshō Ishizuka
Agent #2	Kevin Michael Richardson	Tōru Ōkawa
Beyond
Yoko	Hedy Burress	Rie Machi
Housewife	Tress MacNeille	
Pudgy	Kath Soucie	Kōki Uchiyama
Manabu	Pamela Adlon	Kensho Ono
Masa	Kath Soucie	
Misha	Tara Strong	
Kenny	Tress MacNeille	
Sara	Kath Soucie	
Agent	Matt McKenzie	Yasunori Masutani
Additional voices	Jack Fletcher; Jill Talley; Julia Fletcher; Tom Kenny	
A Detective Story
Ash	James Arnold Taylor	Masane Tsukayama
Trinity	Carrie-Anne Moss	Hiromi Tsuru
Clarence	Terrence C. Carson	
Agent	Matt McKenzie	
Matriculated
Alexa	Melinda Clarke	Takako Honda
Nonaka	Dwight Schultz	
Chyron	Rodney Saulsberry	Jin Yamanoi
Raul	James Arnold Taylor	Isshin Chiba
Rox	Olivia d'Abo	Yū Sugimoto
Sandro	Jack Fletcher	

=== Staff ===
Title	Director	Writer	Story	Studio
Final Flight of the Osiris	Andy Jones	The Wachowskis		Square USA
The Second Renaissance	Mahiro Maeda		The Wachowskis	Studio 4°C
Kid's Story	Shinichirō Watanabe		The Wachowskis	Studio 4°C
Program	Yoshiaki Kawajiri			Madhouse
World Record	Takeshi Koike	Yoshiaki Kawajiri		Madhouse
Beyond	Kōji Morimoto			Studio 4°C
A Detective Story	Shinichirō Watanabe		Manjirô Ôshio	Studio 4°C
Matriculated	Peter Chung			DNA Productions

== Music ==
The Animatrix: The Album

Soundtrack album by Various Artists
- Released: June 3, 2003
- Genres: Electronic music, techno, big beat, house, drum and bass
- Length: 73:02
- Label: Warner Bros.

Professional ratings
Review scores
Source	Rating
Allmusic	2.5/5 stars

The Animatrix: The Album is a 2003 soundtrack album composed by Don Davis. Several electronic music artists are featured, including Juno Reactor and Adam Freeland.

No.	Title	Artist(s)	Length
1.	"Who Am I? (Animatrix Edit)"	Peace Orchestra	6:00
2.	"Big Wednesday"	Free*land	5:02
3.	"Blind Tiger"	Layo & Bushwacka!	6:17
4.	"Under the Gun"	Supreme Beings of Leisure	3:30
5.	"Martenot Waves"	Meat Beat Manifesto	7:47
6.	"Ren 2"	Photek	4:10
7.	"Hands Around My Throat"	Death in Vegas	5:07
8.	"Beauty Never Fades (Animatrix Edit)"	Junkie XL featuring Saffron	6:19
9.	"Supermoves (Animatrix Remix)"	Overseer	4:17
10.	"Conga Fury (Animatrix Mix)"	Juno Reactor	7:29
11.	"Red Pill, Blue Pill"	Junkie XL & Don Davis	9:02
12.	"The Real"	Tech Itch & Don Davis	8:02
Total length:			73:02

=== Additional music ===
The following tracks also appear in The Animatrix, but not on the album:

1. "Masters of the Universe" by Juno Reactor
2. "Virus" by Satoshi Tomiie
3. "Suzuki" by Tosca
4. "Dark Moody" by Junkie XL
