= Eiko Tanaka =

Japanese anime producer

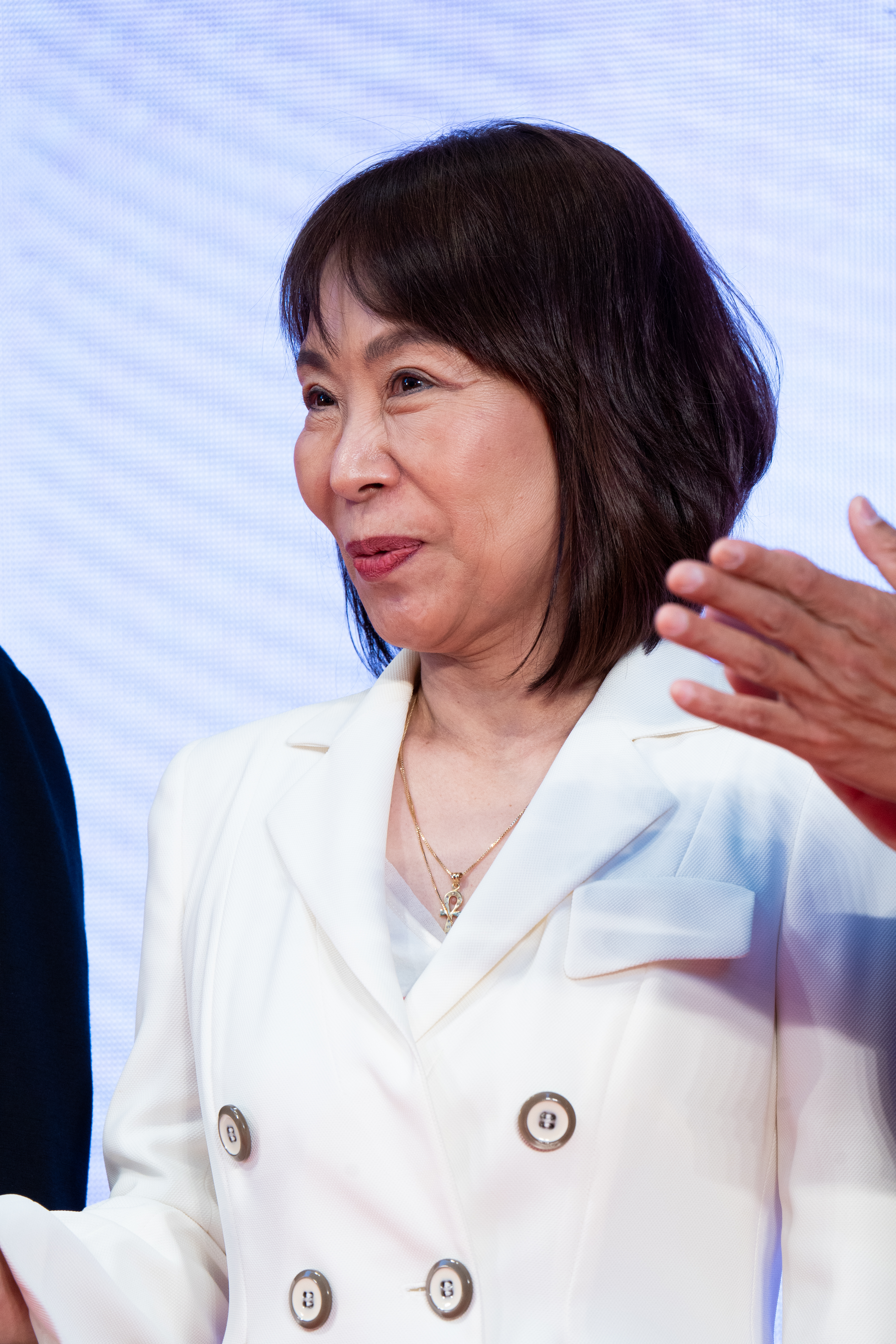
- Tanaka in 2019
- Born: Japan
- Occupations: anime producer; project developer; Studio executive
- Employers: Nippon Animation; Studio 4°C
- Notable work: Memories (1995); The Animatrix (2003); Mind Game (2004); Tekkon Kinkreet (2006)
- Website: Eiko Tanaka on IMDb.com

Eiko Tanaka (田中 栄子, Tanaka Eiko) is a Japanese anime entrepreneur, the co-founder and current chief executive officer of Studio 4°C and producer of the studio. She is also the CEO of a producing company called Beyond C.

Tanaka was one of the supporters of Studio Ghibli at its inception as a line producer.

At Studio 4°C, Tanaka charts the path from scenario to completion of the work and determines the image of the work, including casting, staffing and setting, while at Beyond C., she is mainly responsible for planning and production, as well as fundraising and production management.

Starting with the 1995 film Memories, Tanaka has produced a diverse range of video works for Studio 4°C, including films, short movies, music videos, TV commercials and footage for games. The film Mind Game, which was first directed by Masaaki Yuasa, and. the film Tekkonkinkreet, based on the popular comic book by Taiyō Matsumoto and completed after 13 years of planning, received high acclaim from all quarters. Mind Game won the Grand Prize at the Japan Media Arts Festival. In 2002, she co-produced The Animatrix with Warner Bros.

Tanaka has established Studio 4°C's reputation as an elite creative group, unique among Japanese animation studios, by continuing to emphasise the individuality of its creators and working with them to create cutting-edge visual expressions.

Having experienced a time when there were fewer female production assistants, Tanaka has worked on changing the culture on the production floor so that both men and women can work comfortably.

== Career ==
Tanaka studied Japanese language teaching methods at university. After graduation, she intended to become a Japanese language teacher abroad, but gave up the idea after a motorbike accident.

Tanaka once worked for an advertising agency, but her boss at the time moved to the animation industry and she herself joined Nippon Animation as a result. However, she had a falling out with her boss shortly after joining the company and was shunted off to the production department from the planning department.

When Nippon Animation was assigned to work on three TV series simultaneously, Tanaka single-handedly held three positions in the production department: line producer, production manager and production assistant.

Tanaka worked with Studio Ghibli as a line producer on My Neighbor Totoro and Kiki's Delivery Service. She meets Kōji Morimoto, the animation director for Akira, and Yoshiharu Sato, the animation director for My Neighbor Totoro, at the Ghibli production site, and they ask her to set up a studio for them. So she founded Studio 4°C with them in 1988 as a place for a group of creators. She became the producer and Studio 4°C was started with everyone paying rent together. The first studio was in an ordinary one-story private house where she had lived just before. She was still working for Nippon Animation at this time.

Studio 4°C temporarily broke up around 1993. This was because the members of Studio 4°C each took their own jobs, and individual and group work gradually became blurred and difficult to manage. Studio 4°C as a corporate organisation then moved to a studio in Kichijoji, where it produced the film Memories by Katsuhiro Otomo, in which Koji Morimoto and others participated. Yoshiharu Sato and Ei Inoue chose to go to Nippon Animation. The original studio was rented by Yoshinori Kanada and his associates and named Studio Nonmalt.

Studio 4°C then became a limited company in 1999 and a joint-stock company in 2007.
