= 1954 in animation =

Events in 1954 in animation.

== Events ==
=== January ===
- January 2: Friz Freleng's Tweety and Sylvester cartoon Dog Pounded premieres, produced by Warner Bros. Cartoons. Pepé Le Pew makes a cameo at the end of the short.
- January 4: Warner Bros. Cartoons reopens following the end of the 3D craze.
- January 16: Friz Freleng's Bugs Bunny and Yosemite Sam cartoon Captain Hareblower premieres, produced by Warner Bros. Cartoons.
- January 23: Hanna-Barbera's Tom and Jerry short Puppy Tale premieres, produced by MGM's Cartoon Studio.
- January 30: Hanna-Barbera's Tom and Jerry short Posse Cat, premieres, produced by MGM's Cartoon Studio..

=== February ===
- February 13: Chuck Jones' cartoon Feline Frame-Up premieres, produced by Warner Bros. Cartoons. Starring Marc Anthony, Pussyfoot, & Claude Cat.
- February 20: Tex Avery's Droopy cartoon Drag-a-Long Droopy premieres, produced by MGM's Cartoon Studio. This short marks the final appearance of Slick McWolf in the Golden Age of Animation.
- February 27: Chuck Jones' cartoon No Barking premieres, produced by Warner Bros. Cartoons. Starring Claude Cat & Frisky Puppy, Tweety & Marc Anthony also have cameos in the short.

=== March ===
- March 5: The Donald Duck cartoon Donald's Diary premieres, produced by Walt Disney Animation Studios and directed by Jack Kinney.
- March 13: Friz Freleng's Bugs Bunny cartoon Bugs and Thugs premieres, produced by Warner Bros. Cartoonsin which Mugsy makes his debut.
- March 20: Chuck Jones' Pepé Le Pew cartoon The Cats Bah premieres, produced by Warner Bros. Cartoons. Also starring Penelope Pussycat.
- March 25: 26th Academy Awards: The Walt Disney Company's Toot, Whistle, Plunk and Boom, directed by Ward Kimball and Charles A. Nichols, wins the Academy Award for Best Animated Short.

=== April ===
- April 3: Hanna-Barbera's Tom and Jerry cartoon Hic-cup Pup premieres, produced by MGM's Cartoon Studio and also staring Spike & Tyke.
- April 17: Robert McKimson's Sylvester and Hippety Hopper cartoon Bell Hoppy premieres, produced by Warner Bros. Cartoons.

=== May ===
- May 1: Robert McKimson's Bugs Bunny cartoon No Parking Hare premieres, produced by Warner Bros. Cartoons.
- May 8:
  - Friz Freleng's Sylvester cartoon Dr. Jerkyl's Hide premieres, produced by Warner Bros. Cartoons. Also starring Spike the Bulldog and Chester the Terrier.
  - Tex Avery's Billy Boy premieres, produced by MGM's Cartoon Studio and starring Dixie Wolf.
- May 22: Chuck Jones' second Porky Pig and Sylvester cartoon Claws for Alarm premieres, produced by Warner Bros. Cartoons.
- May 29: Hanna-Barbera's Tom and Jerry short Little School Mouse premieres, produced by MGM's Cartoon Studio and also starring Nibbles.

=== June ===
- June 5: Robert McKimson's Foghorn Leghorn cartoon Little Boy Boo premieres, produced by Warner Bros. Cartoons. Also starring Miss Prissy & Egghead Jr. (which the latter makes his debut in).
- June 6: Hanna-Barbera's Tom and Jerry short Baby Butch premieres, produced by MGM's Cartoon Studio in which the alley cat Butch poses as a baby to steal a leg of ham from Tom.
- June 19: Robert McKimson's Bugs Bunny cartoon Devil May Hare premieres, produced by Warner Bros. Cartoons. The film marks the debut of the Tasmanian Devil.
- June 26: Friz Freleng's Tweety and Sylvester cartoon Muzzle Tough premieres, produced by Warner Bros. Cartoons. Also starring Granny and Hector the Bulldog.

=== July ===
- July 10: Tex Avery's Droopy cartoon Homesteader Droopy premieres, produced by MGM's Cartoon Studio.
- July 24:
  - Chuck Jones' Bugs Bunny cartoon Bewitched Bunny premieres, produced by Warner Bros. Cartoons which marks the debut of Witch Hazel.
  - Hanna-Barbera's Tom and Jerry cartoon Mice Follies premieres, produced by MGM's Cartoon Studio and also starring Nibbles.
- July 31: Dick Lundy's Bird-Brain Bird Dog, produced by MGM's Cartoon Studio. It is the final theatrical Barney Bear cartoon.

=== August ===
- August 7: Friz Freleng's Tweety & Sylvester short Satan's Waitin' premieres, produced by Warner Bros. Cartoons.
- August 13: Jack Hannah's Donald Duck cartoon Grin and Bear It premieres, produced by Walt Disney Animation Studios. It marks the debut of park ranger J. Audubon Woodlore.
- August 14: Chuck Jones' Wile E. Coyote and Road Runner short Stop! Look! And Hasten! premieres, produced by Warner Bros. Cartoons.
- August 28: Friz Freleng's Bugs Bunny cartoon Yankee Doodle Bugs premieres, produced by Warner Bros. Cartoons. Also starring Clyde Bunny.

=== September ===
- September 18: Tex Avery's The Farm of Tomorrow premieres, produced by MGM's Cartoon Studio.

=== October ===
- October 2:
  - Hanna-Barbera's Tom and Jerry short Neapolitan Mouse premieres, produced by MGM's Cartoon Studio.
  - Friz Freleng's Sylvester cartoon By Word of Mouse premieres, produced by Warner Bros. Cartoons.
- October 10: John Paul's Hansel and Gretel: An Opera Fantasy premieres.
- October 16: Chuck Jones' From A to Z-Z-Z-Z premieres, produced by Warner Bros. Cartoons.
- October 27: The first episode of Walt Disney anthology television series airs under the title Walt Disney's Disneyland.

=== November ===
- November 6: Tex Avery's The Flea Circus premieres, produced by MGM's Cartoon Studio.
- November 10: Hanna-Barbera's Tom and Jerry short Downhearted Duckling premieres, produced by MGM's Cartoon Studio and also starring Quacker.
- November 20: Hanna-Barbera's Tom and Jerry short Pet Peeve premieres, produced by MGM's Cartoon Studio. Also starring Spike and the debut of him and Tom's new owners George and Joan. This was the first Tom and Jerry cartoon be produced in CinemaScope.
- November 27: Chuck Jones' Daffy Duck and Porky Pig cartoon My Little Duckaroo premieres, produced by Warner Bros. Cartoons.

=== December ===
- December 4: Tex Avery's Dixieland Droopy premieres, produced by MGM's Cartoon Studio.
- December 18:
  - Chuck Jones' Bugs Bunny cartoon Baby Buggy Bunny premieres, produced by Warner Bros. Cartoons.
  - Hanna-Barbera's Tom and Jerry short Touché, Pussy Cat! premieres, produced by MGM's Cartoon Studio and also starring Nibbles.
- December 20: After having left the Metro-Goldwyn-Mayer cartoon studio, Tex Avery joins Walter Lantz Productions. He directs his first animated short for this studio, I'm Cold which stars Chilly Willy.
- December 29: Halas and Batchelor release Animal Farm, an adaptation of George Orwell's eponymous novel. It is the first British animated feature-length film.
- Specific date unknown:
  - Mikhail Tsekhanovsky's The Frog Princess premieres.
  - Pete Burness' Mr. Magoo short film When Magoo Flew, produced by UPA, premieres.

== Films released ==
- August 19 - The Good Soldier Schweik (Czechoslovakia)
- October 10 - Hansel and Gretel: An Opera Fantasy (United States)
- December - Tsarevna the Frog (Soviet Union)
- December 22 - Animal Farm (United Kingdom and United States)

== Television series ==
- October 27 - Walt Disney anthology TV series (various titles) debuts on ABC, NBC, and CBS.
- Specific date unknown - The Adventures of Paddy the Pelican debuts on ABC.

== Births ==
=== January ===
- January 6:
  - David Sproxton, English animator, director and producer (co-creator of Morph, co-founder of Aardman Animations).
  - John Sparkes, Welsh actor and comedian (voice of the Narrator, Mr. Rabbit, Uncle Pig, Mr. Potato and other various characters in Peppa Pig, the title character, Elvis Cridlington, Station Officer Steele, Norman Price and Dilys Price in season 5 of Fireman Sam, various characters in Planet Sketch, Bitzer and The Farmer in Shaun the Sheep, Mister Elf and King Marigold in Ben & Holly's Little Kingdom, Goronwy in Wallace and Gromit's World of Invention, additional voices in A Town Called Panic and Professor Layton and the Eternal Diva).
- January 7: Sander Schwartz, American animation producer (president of Warner Bros. Animation from 2001 to 2007).
- January 17: Igor Kovalyov, Russian-born American animator, director and educator (Klasky Csupo).
- January 19:
  - Katey Sagal, American actress and singer-songwriter (voice of Turanga Leela in Futurama, Flo Spinelli in Recess, Policewoman Hero in Higglytown Heroes, Mordecai's Mom and Aunt Maxine in Regular Show, Jane 'Butch' LePray in Spirit Riding Free, Duckman's mother in the Duckman episode "The Germ Turns", Hare in the Happily Ever After: Fairy Tales for Every Child episode "Aesop's Fables: A Whodunit Musical").
  - Akira Shigino, Japanese animator (KochiKame: Tokyo Beat Cops, Osomatsu-kun, Bismark, Sailor Moon Crystal, Saban's Adventures of the Little Mermaid), (d. 2024).
- January 20: Ken Page, American actor and singer (voice of Oogie Boogie in The Nightmare Before Christmas, King Gator in All Dogs Go to Heaven, Narrator in the All Grown Up! episode "Blind Man's Bluff"), (d. 2024).
- January 25: Ruth Williamson, American actress (voice of Scotsman's Wife in the Samurai Jack episode "Jack and the Scotsman II", Cafeteria Lady Hero in the Higglytown Heroes episode "Wayne's Toasty Invention", Dame Lady Madame in the Robot and Monster episode "The Party", Ginbot in the Clarence episode "Jeff's New Toy", additional voices in Courage the Cowardly Dog).
- January 26: Sooan Kim, Korean-American animator (Teenage Mutant Ninja Turtles, Æon Flux, The Oblongs, The Simpsons), (d. 2017).
- January 28:
  - Richard Sakai, American film and television producer (The Simpsons, The Critic).
  - Simon Templeman, English actor (voice of Sir Mordred in The Legend of Prince Valiant, Doctor Doom in Fantastic Four, Doctor Dare in Loonatics Unleashed, Sardath in Green Lantern: Beware My Power).
- January 29: Oprah Winfrey, American talk show host, television producer, actress, author and philanthropist (voice of Coretta Scott King in Our Friend, Martin, Judge Bumbleton in Bee Movie, Eudora in The Princess and the Frog, Deborah in The Star).

=== February ===
- February 1: Bill Mumy, American actor (voice of Eon in Buzz Lightyear of Star Command, Johnny Tezuka in Bravest Warriors, Lennier in Babylon 5: The Road Home, Fox in the Batman: The Animated Series episode "The Terrible Trio", Agent Bryson in the Ben 10: Ultimate Alien episode "The Widening Gyre", Dr. Brainchild in The Ren & Stimpy Show, episode "Blazing Entrails", Tim McCole in The Loud House episode "A Fridge Too Far").
- February 4: Shigeru Chiba, Japanese actor (voice of Yoshihiro Kira in JoJo's Bizarre Adventure: Diamond Is Unbreakable, Megane in Urusei Yatsura, Kazuma Kuwabara in YuYu Hakusho, Raditz and Garlic Jr. in Dragon Ball Z, Buggy the Clown in One Piece, Don Kanonji in Bleach, the Narrator in Fist of the North Star, Japanese dub voice of Beast in X-Men, Discord in My Little Pony: Friendship Is Magic, and Megatron in the Transformers franchise).
- February 10: Bobbie Page, American producer and production manager (Warner Bros. Animation).
- February 15: Matt Groening, American comics artist and animator (creator of The Simpsons, Futurama, and Disenchantment).
- February 18: John Travolta, American actor (voice of the title character in Bolt, Mr. Langon in Our Friend, Martin, first voice of Dave in Quantum Quest: A Cassini Space Odyssey).
- February 20: Anthony Head, English actor (voice of Alfred Pennyworth in Batman: Gotham by Gaslight, Professor Third in Fillmore!, Rupert Giles and Albus Dumbledore in the Robot Chicken episode "Endgame", Wizard Con in the Adventure Time: Distant Lands episode "Wizard City"), (d. 2026).
- February 21: Izo Hashimoto, Japanese screenwritwr (Akira), (d. 2026).
- February 28: Enver Petrovci, Kosovar actor (Albanian dub voice of Mufasa in The Lion King franchise), (d. 2025).

=== March ===
- March 1:
  - Ron Howard, American actor and filmmaker (voice of Tom Colonic in Osmosis Jones, Philosophy Club President in From Up on Poppy Hill, himself in The Simpsons episodes "When You Dish Upon a Star" and "Hello Gutter, Hello Fadder").
  - Peter Spellos, American voice actor (voice of Sky-Byte in Transformers: Robots in Disguise, Hitode in Naruto, Bartley Asprius in Code Geass, General Szabo in Blue Dragon), (d. 2023).
- March 4: Catherine O'Hara, Canadian-American actress (voice of Sally and Shock in The Nightmare Before Christmas, Ludmilla in Bartok the Magnificent, Tina in Chicken Little, Kaossandra in Skylanders Academy, Skaelka in The Last Kids on Earth, Aunt Tennelli in The Magic School Bus Rides Again, Susan Frankenstein, Gym Teacher and Weird Girl in Frankenweenie, Judith in Where the Wild Things Are, Kata in Brother Bear 2, Penny in Over the Hedge, Miss Malone in The Completely Mental Misadventures of Ed Grimley, Aunt Edith in Rock & Rule, Brooke Ripple in Elemental, Malicious in Witch's Night Out, Mom in Monster House, Pinktail in The Wild Robot, Morgana in the Sofia the First episode "Gone With the Wand", Gwendolyn Swish in the Central Park episode "The PAIGE-riarchy!"), (d. 2026).
- March 7: Pam Carter, American voice actor (voice of Lena Mack in Street Sharks, Mrs. Andrews in Archie's Weird Mysteries, Sea Beast in Strawberry Shortcake, additional voices in Liberty's Kids) and voice director (DIC Entertainment), (d. 2005).
- March 8: James Carter Cathcart, American voice actor (voice of Professor Oak, James, Meowth and Gary Oak in the Pokémon franchise, Meano in The Ping Pong Club, Prince Philionel el de Seyruun in Slayers, Dr. Change in Private Psycho Lesson, Miki Kaoru in Revolutionary Girl Utena: The Movie, Black Cat in Space Travelers: The Animation, Kumi's Borg in Alien Nine, Weevil Underwood in Yu-Gi-Oh! Duel Monsters, Cyclonis Tarb in Tokyo Mew Mew, Vector the Crocodile in Sonic X), (d. 2025).
- March 11: David Newman, American composer and conductor (The Brave Little Toaster, DuckTales the Movie: Treasure of the Lost Lamp, Rover Dangerfield, Itsy Bitsy Spider, Anastasia, Ice Age, Tarzan, Green Eggs and Ham, Pets United).
- March 24: Robert Carradine, American actor (voice of Lewis Skolnick in the Robot Chicken episode "Boo Cocky"), (d. 2026).

=== April ===
- April 3: Bob Onorato, American animator (Garfield and Friends, Pinky and the Brain), character designer (Adventures from the Book of Virtues) and storyboard artist (Hanna-Barbera, The Spooktacular New Adventures of Casper, Disney Television Animation, The New Woody Woodpecker Show, What's New, Scooby-Doo?, Harvey Birdman, Attorney at Law), (d. 2002).
- April 4: Tom Ruegger, American television producer, writer, and animator (Warner Bros. Animation, Hanna-Barbera, The 7D, Animalia).
- April 7: Jackie Chan, Chinese actor and martial artist (voice of Master Monkey in the Kung Fu Panda franchise, Master Wu in The Lego Ninjago Movie, Chinese dub voice of Li Shang in Mulan, Beast in Beauty and the Beast, and Long in Wish Dragon).
- April 9: Dennis Quaid, American actor (voice of Jaegar Clade in Strange World, Roven in Battle for Terra, Grandpa Redbeard in the SpongeBob SquarePants episode "Grandpappy the Pirate").
- April 10: Peter MacNicol, American actor (voice of X the Eliminator in Harvey Birdman, Attorney at Law, Doctor Octopus in The Spectacular Spider-Man, Man-Bat in The Batman, Sidney Poindexter in Danny Phantom, Nigel in Rapunzel's Tangled Adventure, Tseebo in Star Wars Rebels, David Clinton / Chronos in the Justice League Unlimited episode "The Once and Future Thing", The Invader in The Day the Earth Blew Up: A Looney Tunes Movie).
- April 13: Glen Keane, American animator (Walt Disney Animation Studios, The Chipmunk Adventure, Dear Basketball, Over the Moon).
- April 14: Katsuhiro Otomo, Japanese manga artist, screenwriter, animator and film director (Akira).
- April 17: Roddy Piper, Canadian professional wrestler and actor (portrayed himself in Hulk Hogan's Rock 'n' Wrestling, voice of Bolphunga in Green Lantern: Emerald Knights, Don John in the Adventure Time episode "The Red Throne", himself in the Robot Chicken episode "Metal Militia"), (d. 2015).
- April 27: John Cygan, American actor and comedian (voice of Hedley in Treasure Planet, Uncle Lope in Leo the Lion, Richard Kensington in Cars, Who in Horton Hears a Who!, Twitch in Toy Story 3, Male Radio Caller and Gus in Superman/Batman: Apocalypse, Abel North and Kane North in the Ben 10 episode "Super Alien Hero Buddy Adventures", TV Announcer and Man at Police Station in The Grim Adventures of Billy & Mandy episode "Bearded Billy", various characters in Regular Show, additional voices in Space Strikers, Titan A.E., Poochini, Ice Age: The Meltdown, Happily N'Ever After, Surf's Up, WALL-E, Cars Toons, Up, Cloudy with a Chance of Meatballs, The Lorax, Monsters University, Despicable Me 2, The Pirate Fairy, Inside Out, Minions and Despicable Me 3), (d. 2017).
- April 28: Roy Braverman, American sound supervisor, sound editor, and composer (Disney Television Animation, Warner Bros. Animation, Cartoon Network Studios, Nickelodeon Animation Studio).
- April 29: Jerry Seinfeld, American actor, comedian, writer and producer (writer, producer and voice of Barry B. Benson in Bee Movie, Comp-U-Comp in the Dilbert episode "The Return").

=== May ===
- May 8: Stephen Furst, American actor (voice of Fanboy in Freakazoid!, Hathi in Jungle Cubs, Dash in The Little Mermaid II: Return to the Sea, Booster in Buzz Lightyear of Star Command, Male Warthog in the Timon & Pumbaa episode "Home Is Where the Hog Is", Sport in the Road Rovers episode "The Dog Who Knew Too Much"), (d. 2017).
- May 10: Mike Hagerty, American actor (voice of Cop #1 and Editor in the American Dad episode "Not Particularly Desperate Housewife"), (d. 2022).
- May 14: Jeffrey Townsend, American director, television writer (Rugrats) and composer (composed the Gracie Films logo).
- May 15: Jan Frycz, Polish actor (Polish dub voice of Thanos in What If...?), (d. 2026).
- May 17: David Zippel, American musical theatre lyricist, director, and producer (Walt Disney Animation Studios, The Swan Princess).
- May 21:
  - Janice Karman, American voice actress, producer and director (creator and voice of the Chipettes and wife of Ross Bagdasarian Jr.).
  - Jill Jacobson, American actress (voice of Marina's Mother in The Stone Boy), (d. 2024).
- May 28: Townsend Coleman, American actor (voice of the title character in The Tick, Michelangelo and the Rat King in Teenage Mutant Ninja Turtles, Colt in Saber Rider and the Star Sheriffs, Rory Llewellyn in Jem, Corporal Capeman in Inspector Gadget, Sentinel Prime in Transformers: Animated, Neddy the Mallet in Mighty Magiswords, the Vulture Police in Timon & Pumbaa).

=== June ===
- June 2:
  - Richard Sala, American comics artist, illustrator and animator (Liquid Television), (d. 2020).
  - Mike Svayko, American animator (American Pop, Fire and Ice, Starchaser: The Legend of Orin), storyboard artist (Disney Television Animation, Nickelodeon Animation Studio), background artist (Barbie and the Rockers: Out of This World), prop designer (The Chipmunk Adventure), technical director (Starchaser: The Legend of Orin), sheet timer (Disney Television Animation, Klasky Csupo, Charlotte's Web 2: Wilbur's Great Adventure) and director (Beetle Bailey, The Little Clowns of Happytown, Dino-Riders, Cartoon All-Stars to the Rescue, Disney Television Animation, Star Street: The Adventures of the Star Kids, Spider-Man, CatDog, ChalkZone), (d. 2002).
  - Dennis Haysbert, American actor (voice of Crash in Puppy Dog Pals, Master Ox in Kung Fu Panda 2, Chief Barnsdale in Static Shock, Kilowog in Justice League, Zipper in Chip 'n Dale: Rescue Rangers, General Hologram in Wreck-It Ralph, Kale in Sinbad: Legend of the Seven Seas).
- June 9: George Pérez, American comic book artist (DC Comics) and writer (voiced himself in the Teen Titans Go! episodes "Marv Wolfman & George Pérez" and "Creative Geniuses"), (d. 2022).
- June 14: Jan Rabson, American actor (voice of Hooty and Professor Brighthead in G-Force: Guardians of Space, Tetsuo in Akira, Gordo Leiter, Jaws, Bilge, Reginald Farragut and other various characters in James Bond Jr., Kerma in Teenage Mutant Ninja Turtles, King Donogard in Skeleton Warriors, Jolt Volt and Top Hat in Creepy Crawlers, Axel in A Bug's Life, Midas and Nack in Barbie as the Princess and the Pauper, Principal Affleck in Bratz, Joe Lacky in Bratz: Pampered Petz, Zhu Fu in Quest for Zhu, Professor Quantum in Superbook, Mulia Mild and Wind Rider in My Little Pony: Friendship Is Magic, Avery in The Real Adventures of Jonny Quest episode "Alligators and Okeechobee Vikings", Professor Erlich in the Justice League episode "Paradise Lost", Steve Malone in the Rugrats episode "Early Retirement"), (d. 2022).
- June 15: Jim Belushi, American actor, comedian and musician (voice of Simon the Monster Hunter in Aaahh!!! Real Monsters, Rocko in The Pebble and the Penguin, Fang in Gargoyles, Phil Palmfeather in The Mighty Ducks, Reginald the Mouse King in The Nuttiest Nutcracker, Glo-Bo in Doc McStuffins, Paul Revere in the Where on Earth Is Carmen Sandiego? episode "Date with Carmen Part 2", Mr. Fleener in The Tick episode "The Tick vs. Education").
- June 19: Kathleen Turner, American actress (voice of Jessica Rabbit in Who Framed Roger Rabbit, Constance in Monster House, Liz Strickland in King of the Hill, Stacy Lovell in The Simpsons episode "Lisa vs. Malibu Stacy", Gwendolyn in the 3Below: Tales of Arcadia episode "There's Something About Gwen (of Gorben)", the title character in the Wizards: Tales of Arcadia episode "Lady of the Lake", Monogatron Leader's Wife in the Rick and Morty episode "The Old Man and the Seat", Mole Judge in the Summer Camp Island episode "Molar Moles", herself in the Family Guy episode "Foxx in the Men House").
- June 21: Mike MacDonald, French-born Canadian actor and comedian (voice of the Mouse King in The Nutcracker Prince, Rip in The Ripping Friends, Lifeguard in the Ren & Stimpy "Adult Party Cartoon" episode "Naked Beach Frenzy"), (d. 2018).

=== July ===
- July 2:
  - Sue Rose, American cartoonist, animator, voice actress and television writer (Doc McStuffins, Kuu Kuu Harajuku, creator of Pepper Ann, co-creator and voice of the title character in Angela Anaconda).
  - Wendy Schaal, American actress (voice of Francine Smith in American Dad!, Secretary and Newport Heiress in the Family Guy episodes "The Peter Principal" and "Con Heiress").
- July 7: Ron Jones, American composer (DuckTales, Superman, Family Guy, American Dad!, The Fairly OddParents).
- July 17: J Michael Straczynski, American filmmaker and comic book writer (He-Man and the Masters of the Universe, She-Ra: Princess of Power, Jayce and the Wheeled Warriors, The Real Ghostbusters, CBS Storybreak, Spiral Zone, Babylon 5: The Road Home).
- July 19: Steve O'Donnell, American television writer (Space Ghost Coast to Coast, The Simpsons).
- July 28: Philip Williams, Canadian actor (voice of Baxter Bevel in Rolie Polie Olie, Banshee in X-Men: The Animated Series, Ted in Miss Spider's Sunny Patch Friends, Zephir in Babar, Toulouse in Cadillacs and Dinosaurs, Sergeant Murphy in The Busy World of Richard Scarry, Stanley in Stickin' Around, Klang in Pippi Longstocking, Mr. Breen in the Anne of Green Gables: The Animated Series episode "The Avonlea Herald", Mr. MacKenzie in the Braceface episode "Angels Among Us", Zell and Yug in the Time Warp Trio episode "The Cavemen Catastrophe", continued voice of Buzz in Cyberchase), (d. 2024).

=== August ===
- August 4:
  - Donald Gibb, American actor (voice of Bromanor in the Secret Mountain Fort Awesome episode "The 6th Disgustoid"), (d. 2026).
  - Martin Pasko, Canadian-American comics writer and animation writer (Thundarr the Barbarian, Teenage Mutant Ninja Turtles, Batman: The Animated Series), (d. 2020).
- August 6: John Moschitta Jr., American actor, singer and spokesman (voice of Blurr in the Transformers franchise, Key-Per in the Adventure Time episode "The Enchiridion!", Jim Spleen in the Family Guy episode "Fox-y Lady", Mr. Sackett in the Pinky and the Brain episode "You Said a Mouseful", Herb Leventhal in the Bobby's World episode "Misery Loves Company").
- August 13: Peter Hannan, American animator, singer-songwriter, author, illustrator, writer, and producer (Pound Puppies, Let's Go Luna!, creator of CatDog).
- August 20:
  - Al Roker, American weather presenter, journalist, television personality and author (voice of Patrick Patrickson in Cloudy with a Chance of Meatballs and Cloudy with a Chance of Meatballs 2, Sam Vander Rom in Cyberchase, Mailbox in Robots, Newscaster in Madagascar: Escape 2 Africa, The Pirate Who Likes Sunsets and Kittens in The Pirates! In an Adventure with Scientists!, Sum in Kung Fu Panda 3, Weatherman in the Superman: The Animated Series episode "Little Girl Lost", himself in The Proud Family and The Proud Family: Louder and Prouder, additional voices in Quest for Camelot and WordGirl).
  - Theresa Saldana, American actress (voice of Rosa in New Kids on the Block, Mame Slaughter in Captain Planet and the Planeteers, Estella Velasquez in The Real Adventures of Jonny Quest, Mrs. Diaz in the Batman Beyond episode "Unmasked"), (d. 2016).
  - Nina Elias-Bamberger (Note: Most sources and her grave say she was born on August 20, 1954.), American television producer (Sesame Street, Dragon Tales, creator of Big Bag and Tiny Planets), (d. 2002).
- August 23: Danny Mandia, Filipino dubbing director (Heidi, Girl of the Alps, Dog of Flanders, Anne of Green Gables, Voltron, Tales of Little Women, Peter Pan: The Animated Series, The Twins of Destiny, The Legend of Snow White, Magic Knight Rayearth, Akazukin Chacha, Zenki, Kim Possible, Ragnarok the Animation), (d. 2024).
- August 24: Joe Ochman, American actor (voice of André Bourgeois in Miraculous: Tales of Ladybug & Cat Noir, Wooster Q. Weasel in Animalia, continued voice of Jiminy Cricket).
- August 28: Bob Bendetson, American television writer and producer (The Simpsons).
- August 30: David Paymer, American actor (voice of Sheldon Cargo in Channel Umptee-3, Dean Whitehead in the Godzilla: The Series episode "Talkin' Trash", Mason Andrews in the Static Shock episode "Hoop Squad").

=== September ===
- September 3: Kevin Petrilak, American animator (The Simpsons, Bobby's World, Rover Dangerfield, Once Upon a Forest, Exosquad, The Swan Princess, Space Jam), storyboard artist (He-Man and the Masters of the Universe, Muppet Babies, Spiral Zone), sheet timer (Hanna-Barbera, Film Roman, Disney Television Animation, Courage the Cowardly Dog, Cartoon Network Studios, Codename: Kids Next Door, Warner Bros. Animation, Nickelodeon Animation Studio) and director (Johnny Bravo, Nickelodeon Animation Studio).
- September 7: Michael Emerson, American actor (voice of Joker in Batman: The Dark Knight Returns, Alpha in Ben 10/Generator Rex: Heroes United, Doctor Venom in the G.I. Joe: Renegades episode "The Anaconda Strain", Brainiac in My Adventures with Superman).
- September 8: David Schwartz, American animator, storyboard artist (ALF Tales, The Real Ghostbusters, The Simpsons, Disney Television Animation, Yo Yogi!, Warner Bros. Animation, Rugrats, Fantastic Four, The Incredible Hulk, Clerks: The Animated Series, Courage the Cowardly Dog, X-Men: Evolution, Tutenstein, Curious George, Class of 3000, TMNT, The Spectacular Spider-Man, Wolverine and the X-Men, Sit Down, Shut Up, Ben 10: Destroy All Aliens, Sheriff Callie's Wild West, Doc McStuffins, The VeggieTales Show), writer (Johnny Bravo, Ben 10, New Looney Tunes) and director (Captain Simian & the Space Monkeys, Jumanji, Channel Umptee-3, Johnny Bravo), (d. 2021).
- September 9: Jeffrey Combs, American actor (voice of the Question in Justice League Unlimited, the Leader in The Avengers: Earth's Mightiest Heroes, Rat King in Teenage Mutant Ninja Turtles, Kuphulu in Ben 10: Omniverse, Gyrus Krinkle in Super Robot Monkey Team Hyperforce Go!, Professor Hatecraft in Scooby-Doo! Mystery Incorporated, Kite Man in the Batman: The Brave and the Bold episode "Long Arm of the Law!", Scarecrow in The New Batman Adventures episode "Never Fear").
- September 13: Isiah Whitlock Jr., American actor (voice of River Scott in Cars 3, Commander Burnside in Lightyear, Bird King in Hoppers, C.E.O. in the BoJack Horseman episode "Head in the Clouds", Mayor Naise in the Apple & Onion episode "Election Day"), (d. 2025).
- September 14: Curtis Cim, American animator (Hanna-Barbera, Filmation, Zodiac Entertainment, King of the Hill, My Little Pony: A Very Minty Christmas) and storyboard artist (Calico Entertainment, King of the Hill, Warner Bros. Animation, Dragon Tales, Courage the Cowardly Dog, Scooby-Doo and the Cyber Chase, The Wild Thornberrys, As Told by Ginger, Clifford's Puppy Days, The Land Before Time, Curious George, Care Bears: Oopsy Does It!, My Little Pony: Twinkle Wish Adventure, Angelina Ballerina: The Next Steps), (d. 2020).
- September 19: Janet Perlman, Canadian animator (National Film Board of Canada, Sesame Street).
- September 22: Shari Belafonte, American actress (voice of Blanche in Gravedale High, Mrs. Johanssen in Hey Arnold!, Marion Cornwalis in the Pepper Ann episode "The Velvet Room", Diana Cruz in The Real Adventures of Jonny Quest episode "Other Space").
- September 26: Wayne Moss, Canadian director (Shining Time Station, Noddy), (d. 2025).
- September 28: Stephen James Taylor, American composer (Tiny Toon Adventures, G.I. Joe: A Real American Hero, Disney Television Animation, Happily Ever After: Fairy Tales for Every Child, Black Panther).

=== October ===
- October 1: Masahiko Tanaka, Japanese actor (voice of Gauron in Full Metal Panic!, Kyoichi Sudo in Initial D, Muramasa Kaburagi in Tiger & Bunny, Dot Pixis in Attack on Titan, Japanese dub voice of Ra's al Ghul in Batman: The Animated Series and Beware the Batman, Francis in A Bug's Life, and Stoick in the How to Train Your Dragon franchise).
- October 2: Frank Budgen, English commercial director and co-founder of Gorgeous Enterprises (directed the NSPCC advert "Cartoon"), (d. 2015).
- October 3: Paweł Sanakiewicz, Polish actor (Polish dub voice of James P. Sullivan in Monsters, Inc. and Monsters University, Pacha in The Emperor's New Groove and Kronk's New Groove, Max Tennyson in Ben 10 and Ben 10: Alien Force, Hades in Justice League Unlimited), (d. 2023).
- October 6: Howard Hoffman, American actor (voice of Courage, Muriel Bagge, and Eustace Bagge in the What a Cartoon! episode "The Chicken from Outer Space", Head Scientist in the Shorty McShorts' Shorts episode "Dudley and Nestor Do Nothing", additional voices in Queer Duck: The Movie).
- October 8: Jim Smith, American animator (Mighty Mouse: The New Adventures, The New Adventures of Beany and Cecil, McGee and Me!, Tiny Toon Adventures, The Oblongs, Electric City, Cans Without Labels), storyboard artist (DIC Entertainment, Defenders of the Earth, Spiral Zone, Mighty Mouse: The New Adventures, Warner Bros. Animation, Poochini, Samurai Jack, The X's, The Haunted World of El Superbeasto, YooHoo & Friends, Cans Without Labels), character designer (Samurai Jack), background artist (Over the Garden Wall), musician, writer (Samurai Jack), director (The New Adventures of Beany and Cecil), and producer (The Ren & Stimpy Show, co-founder of Spümcø), (d. 2025).
- October 9:
  - Scott Bakula, American actor (voice of Danny in Cats Don't Dance, himself in The Simpsons episode "Bobby, It's Cold Outside").
  - John O'Hurley, American actor (voice of Johannes Neils in the Tarzan franchise, King Neptune in SpongeBob SquarePants, King Nova in Buzz Lightyear of Star Command, Captain Excellent in Teamo Supremo, Mr. Slate in The Flintstones & WWE: Stone Age SmackDown!, Captain Star Johnson in Duck Dodgers, Phantom Blot in Mickey Mouse Works and House of Mouse, Walter Bunny in The Looney Tunes Show, Grandmaster in The Super Hero Squad Show episode "Whom Continuity Would Destroy!").
- October 10: Patric Zimmerman, American retired voice actor (voice of Elroy Jetson in Jetsons: The Movie, Augie Doggie and Dixie in Fender Bender 500 and Yo Yogi!, Tyke in Tom & Jerry Kids, Junkyard in Toxic Crusaders, Felix in Capitol Critters, additional voices in Popeye and Son, The New Yogi Bear Show, and The Grim Adventures of Billy & Mandy).
- October 16:
  - Ellen Gerstell, American voice actress (voice of Mihoshi Kuramitsu in Tenchi Muyo!).
  - Jeff McCarthy, American actor (voice of Michigan J. Frog from 1995 to 2006).
- October 18: Bob Weinstein, American film and television producer (Princess Mononoke, Clerks: The Animated Series, Tokyo Pig, Unstable Fables, The Nutty Professor, Hoodwinked Too! Hood vs. Evil, Escape from Planet Earth, Underdogs, Paddington, Spy Kids: Mission Critical).

=== November ===
- November 5: Mike Gabriel, American animator and film director (Walt Disney Animation Studios).
- November 7: Unknown Hinson, American singer, musician, songwriter, actor and comedian (voice of Early Cuyler in Squidbillies).
- November 11: Roger Slifer, American comic book writer, screenwriter, and television producer (Sunbow Entertainment), (d. 2015).
- November 13: Chris Noth, American actor (voice of Lex Luthor in Justice League: Crisis on Two Earths, Akio Kazama in From Up on Poppy Hill).
- November 18: Carter Burwell, American film composer (A Goofy Movie, Anomalisa).
- November 21: Timothy Stack, American actor, producer and screenwriter (voice of Lampy in The Brave Little Toaster, The Brave Little Toaster to the Rescue, and The Brave Little Toaster Goes to Mars).
- November 25: Dave Alex Riddett, English cinematographer (Aardman Animations).
- November 27:
  - Kimmy Robertson, American actress (portrayed Race Spectator in Stuart Little, voice of Duzer in Gravedale High, Featherduster in Beauty and the Beast and House of Mouse, Alana in The Little Mermaid franchise, Penny in Super Secret Secret Squirrel, Dot in The Tick, Gwen Mezzrow in Pepper Ann, Fifi in Belle's Magical World, Ollie in Ollie & Scoops, Samantha Stanky in The Simpsons episode "Bart's Friend Falls in Love", Donna in the Fish Police episode "No Way to Treat a Fillet-dy", Alice Pleasance in the Batman: The Animated Series episode "Mad as a Hatter", Margo in the Batman Beyond episode "Disappearing Inque", additional voices in Bill & Ted's Excellent Adventures, Tom & Jerry Kids and Droopy, Master Detective).
  - Steven Banks, American actor (voice of Dr. Morley in the King of the Hill episode "Hank's Unmentionable Problem"), musician, comedian and television writer (Nickelodeon Animation Studio, Hi Hi Puffy AmiYumi, Lego City Adventures, Superhero Kindergarten).
- November 28: Marty Grabstein, American actor (voice of the title character in Courage the Cowardly Dog and Straight Outta Nowhere: Scooby-Doo! Meets Courage the Cowardly Dog, Singing Chest in the Wonder Showzen episode "Ocean").

=== December ===
- December 4: Tony Todd, American actor (voice of Darkseid in the DC Animated Movie Universe Dreadwing in Transformers: Prime, Icon in Young Justice, Slyrak in Dota: Dragon's Blood, Scare Glow in Masters of the Universe: Revelation, Astaroth in the Batman: The Brave and the Bold episode "Trials of the Demon!", Dark Shaman in the Sym-Bionic Titan episode "Shaman of Fear", Aeon Worm in the Bravest Warriors episode "Season of the Mitch"), (d. 2024).
- December 18: Ray Liotta, American actor and producer (voice of Zack in the Family Guy episode "Brian Does Hollywood", Bubble Poppin Boys Leader in the SpongeBob SquarePants episode "What Ever Happened to SpongeBob?", Morty Szyslak in The Simpsons episode "King Leer", himself in Bee Movie and the Phineas and Ferb episode "What A Croc!"), (d. 2022).
- December 20: Dave Simons, American comic book artist, animator and storyboard artist (Marvel Productions, Spiral Zone, Teenage Mutant Ninja Turtles, DIC Entertainment, Conan the Adventurer, Captain Planet and the Planeteers, Universal Cartoon Studios, Gargoyles, X-Men, Street Fighter: the Animated Series, Extreme Ghostbusters, Men in Black: The Series, Courage the Cowardly Dog, Butt-Ugly Martians, The Zula Patrol, Maya & Miguel, Kappa Mikey), (d. 2009).
- December 26:
  - Tony Rosato, Italian-Canadian actor and comedian (voice of Luigi in The Adventures of Super Mario Bros. 3 and Super Mario World, Orpheus and Young Nomad in Mythic Warriors, Duke in George and Martha, Quentin Eggert in Pelswick, Tom in the Monster by Mistake episode "Warren's Nightmare", Sherriff Ironsides in the Odd Job Jack episode "Odd Job John", Zane in the 6teen episode "Unhappy Anniversary", additional voices in The Busy World of Richard Scarry, Stickin' Around, The Adventures of Sam & Max: Freelance Police, Blaster's Universe, The Ripping Friends, Carl², Da Boom Crew and Detentionaire), (d. 2017).
  - Ozzie Smith, American former professional baseball player (voiced himself in The Simpsons episode "Homer at the Bat").
- December 30: Gordon Goodwin, American composer (Freakazoid!, Wild West C.O.W.-Boys of Moo Mesa, Road Rovers, The Legend of Tarzan, The Sylvester & Tweety Mysteries, Animaniacs, Pinky and the Brain, Toonsylvania, Histeria!, Bah, Humduck! A Looney Tunes Christmas, Tom and Jerry Tales), (d. 2025).

=== Specific date unknown ===
- Mac Torres, American animator (Pac-Man, Who Framed Roger Rabbit, Jetsons: The Movie, Teenage Mutant Ninja Turtles, Dino Babies, Space Jam), (d. 2021).
- Ellen Lichtwardt Goodchild, American animator (American Pop, Heidi's Song, Thumbelina, Nest Family Entertainment, Johnny Bravo, The King and I, The Tigger Movie), visual effects artist (Industrial Light & Magic, Who Framed Roger Rabbit), art director (Street Sharks) and writer (Danny Phantom).
- Gordon Kent, American animator (Fangface), storyboard artist (Ruby-Spears Enterprises, The Scooby and Scrappy-Doo Puppy Hour, Mork & Mindy/Laverne & Shirley/Fonz Hour, Tom and Jerry: The Fast and the Furry, Ben 10: Destroy All Aliens), sheet timer (Bureau of Alien Detectors, Life with Louie, X-Men: The Animated Series, Disney Television Animation, All Dogs Go to Heaven: The Series, Courage the Cowardly Dog, CatDog, Warner Bros. Animation, Stripperella, Codename: Kids Next Door, Holly Hobbie & Friends, Family Guy, Film Roman, The Land Before Time, Chowder, Adventure Time, Allen Gregory, Bob's Burgers, Brickleberry), lip sync artist (Dead Space: Aftermath), recording director (Scooby-Doo! in Arabian Nights, A Flintstones Christmas Carol), writer (Ruby-Spears Enterprises, Hanna-Barbera, Marvel Productions, Star Wars: Droids, Garbage Pail Kids, Tiny Toon Adventures, Beetlejuice, Mother Goose and Grimm, Disney Television Animation, Taz-Mania, The Real Shlemiel, Spider-Man, Pocket Dragon Adventures), producer (Hanna-Barbera, Bonkers) and director (Teen Wolf, The Prince of Atlantis, Disney Television Animation, The Grim Adventures of Billy & Mandy), (d. 2015).
- Peter Hudecki, Canadian animator (Nelvana).
- Charlie Mills, British animator (The Trap Door, Stoppit and Tidyup).
- Kathy Kinney, American actress and comedian (voice of Jenny the Monkey in Big Guy and Rusty the Boy Robot, Mama Destructo in Pepper Ann, Sheriff Ellen Perkins in the What's New, Scooby-Doo? episode "A Scooby-Doo Christmas", O'Farrell's Mom in the Fillmore! episode "A Forgotten Yesterday", Brat in the CatDog episode "Harasslin' Match", Rhonda in The Penguins of Madagascar).

== Deaths ==
=== June ===
- June 11: Lajos Jámbor, Hungarian-American painter, illustrator, and background artist for animation (background artist for the Fleischer Studios, worked on the backgrounds of the animated feature film Gulliver's Travels), dies at age 69.

=== August ===
- August 17: Billy Murray, American singer (voice of Bimbo in the Betty Boop cartoons), dies at age 77.

=== September ===
- September 7: Bud Fisher, American cartoonist (creator of the comic strip Mutt and Jeff, credited as the writer, animator, and director for the strip's animated adaptations released by the Fox Film Corporation, though most animation was done by Raoul Barré and Charles Bowers), dies at age 69.
- September 27: Hy Mayer, German-American political cartoonist, comic artist and animator (The Travels of Teddy, with Otto Messmer), dies at age 86.

=== November ===
- November 22: Moroni Olsen, American actor (voice of Magic Mirror in Snow White and the Seven Dwarfs), dies at age 65.

=== December ===
- December 6: Bill Nolan, American animator, director and animation writer (Pat Sullivan, Margaret J. Winkler, Walter Lantz, Metro-Goldwyn-Mayer cartoon studio), dies at age 60.
- December 30: Ada Driver, Australian photographer, (created her own magic lantern slides and stereoscopic photographs, some of which have been bequeathed to the State Library of Queensland), dies at age 86.

== See also ==
- List of anime by release date (1946–1959)
