= Bump (British TV series) =

- Also known as: Bump the Baby Elephant
- Genre: Children's
- Created by: Charles Mills; Terry Brain
- Written by: Christopher James
- Narrated by: Simon Cadell
- Composer: Steve Augarde
- Country of origin: United Kingdom
- Original language: English
- No. of series: 2
- No. of episodes: 27

Production
- Executive producer: Theresa Plummer-Andrews
- Producer: Dennis Hooper
- Running time: 5 minutes (one 10-minute Christmas special)
- Production companies: Bump Enterprises Ltd. (Note: Animation outsourced to CMTB Animation.); Abbey Broadcast Communications (Series 2); Videal Produckions-GmbH (Series 2)

Original release
- Network: BBC1 (Children's BBC)
- Release: 14 September 1990 – 26 December 1994

Bump the Baby Elephant is a British animated children's television series which was created by Charles Mills and Terry Brain (who had previously created The Trap Door and Stoppit and Tidyup), produced by Bump Enterprises Ltd. and originally shown on BBC One from 14 September 1990 to 26 December 1994.

The series' two main protagonists are the eponymous Bump (a baby elephant who is very clumsy, a trait that emphasised by a bandage on his forehead) and his friend Birdie (a bluebird who often gives Bump advice on how he can become more graceful). The two series ran a total of twenty-six episodes, each 5 minutes long. The twenty-seventh and final episode was a Christmas special that was 10 minutes long. The programme is narrated by Simon Cadell.

Bump and Birdie regularly encounter animals that have a problem (such as Whizzer the mouse, Munch the tortoise, McDuff the dog, Big Bun and Little Bun the rabbits and Batty the bat) and help them to find a solution. Most of these animals are recurring characters, and all of the characters' Stoppit and Tidyup-like sounds were generated by analogue synthesizers.

== Episodes ==
=== Series 1 (1990) ===
All thirteen of the first series' episodes were initially shown on BBC One as part of the Children's BBC strand on Fridays at 3:50 pm.

No. overall	No. in series	Title	Original release date
1	1	"Bump and the Hole"	14 September 1990
Birdie offers to take Bump to a place where there are no trees to bump into.
2	2	"Bump and the Clouds"	21 September 1990
Bump has a dream about sitting on a cloud and floating around the world.
3	3	"Bump's Upside Down Friend"	28 September 1990
Bump and Batty have something in common - they both like standing on their heads.
4	4	"Bump Plays a Trick"	5 October 1990
Whizzer turns over a new leaf after a game of hide-and-seek.
5	5	"A Ride with Bump"	12 October 1990
Bump has something special to share with his friends.
6	6	"Bump's Lost Button"	19 October 1990
Bump is very upset when he loses one of his buttons, so all of his friends help him to look for it.
7	7	"Bump Has a Funny Day"	26 October 1990
Strange things happen when Bump finds some stones.
8	8	"Bump's New Game"	2 November 1990
Bump decides that walking backwards will stop him bumping into things.
9	9	"Bump Learns to Fly"	9 November 1990
Bump's attempts at flying leave him firmly on the ground.
10	10	"Bump and the Monster"	16 November 1990
Bump has a big surprise when he and Birdie take a stroll by the river.
11	11	"Bump Wants to Help"	23 November 1990
Bump is saddened to discover he is too big to help his friends.
12	12	"Bump's Loud Song"	30 November 1990
Bump's loud trumpeting makes a din and saves the day.
13	13	"Bump Goes Away"	7 December 1990
When Bump feels he is a nuisance, he finds out who his real friends are.

=== Series 2 (1994) ===
All thirteen of the second series' episodes were initially screened on BBC One, again as part of the Children's BBC strand, on Mondays at 3:45 pm, and although they were produced in 1993, they were not broadcast until 10 January 1994. The twenty-seventh episode was initially shown on BBC One, once again as part of the Children's BBC strand, on Boxing Day 1994 at 7:55 am.

No. overall	No. in series	Title	Original release date
14	1	"Bump's Umbrella"	10 January 1994
Birdie comes to the rescue when Bump has problems with his umbrella.
15	2	"Bump and the Talking Tree"	17 January 1994
Bump becomes a laughing stock after he is caught talking to a tree.
16	3	"Bump and Aunty Doreen's Surprise"	24 January 1994
Birdie tells Bump that Aunty Doreen is waiting for him by the river with a surprise.
17	4	"Bump and the Bucket"	31 January 1994
Bump steps back and plants his foot in a bucket whilst trying to get out of Whizzer's way.
18	5	"Bump's First Ride"	7 February 1994
Birdie takes his friends for a ride, but then notices that Bump is looking a little sad.
19	6	"Bump's Big Ears"	14 February 1994
When Bump pulls on a piece of string hanging from a tree, he is surprised to find it belongs to Cousin Jay.
20	7	"Bump and the Baby Mountain"	21 February 1994
Bump makes a flag and is eager to show it to Birdie.
21	8	"Bump and the Statue"	28 February 1994
On the way to meet his friends with his truck, Bump encounters a tall, grey figure in the bushes.
22	9	"Bump and the Flying Flowers"	7 March 1994
Bump loves flowers, especially those with a nice smell.
23	10	"Bump's Special Day"	14 March 1994
Bump gets very angry with himself because he cannot remember something important.
24	11	"Bump and the Pouncing Game"	21 March 1994
When Bump goes to visit Birdie one morning, he will not leave his tree.
25	12	"Bump the Builder"	28 March 1994
Bump is tidying up his house, but decides to go out and play instead.
26	13	"Bump and the Windy Day"	4 April 1994
Birdie will not come out to play because the wind is blowing too hard.
27	14	"Bump's Christmas Story"	26 December 1994
On his way to see Santa Claus at the North Pole, Bump meets a snowman who convinces him that Christmas may never happen.

== UK VHS releases ==
Two VHS tapes, which contain all thirteen episodes of the first series between them, were released by Abbey Home Media in the UK in 1991. The first one was later reissued on DVD under the title Bump: My First DVD in 2004 (three episodes from the second series and the Christmas special were also released on another DVD, Bump: Christmas Story, in 2006, but they were never previously released on VHS).

VHS title	Release date	Episodes
Bump: My First Video	11 February 1991	"Bump Has a Funny Day"; "Bump Learns to Fly"; "Bump and the Monster"; "Bump's Loud Song"; "Bump and the Clouds"; "A Ride with Bump"
The Adventures of Bump	4 March 1991	"Bump and the Hole"; "Bump's Upside Down Friend"; "Bump Plays a Trick"; "Bump's New Game"; "Bump Goes Away"; "Bump's Lost Button"; "Bump Wants to Help"
Bump's Christmas Story	2001	"Bump's Christmas Story"; "Bump and the Talking Tree"; "Bump's Big Ears"; "Bump's Umbrella"
The Very Best of Bump	2004	"Bump and Auntie Doreen's Surprise"; "Bump and the Bucket"; "Bump and the Baby Mountain"; "Bump and the Statue"; "Bump and the Flying Flowers"; "Bump the Builder"
