= 2002 in anime =

The events of 2002 in anime.

== Events ==
- February 7 – Manglobe is created

== Accolades ==
At the Mainichi Film Awards, Crayon Shin-chan: The Storm Called: The Battle of the Warring States won the Animation Film Award and Millennium Actress won the Ōfuji Noburō Award. Internationally, Spirited Away became the first, and so far only, anime to win both the Academy Award for Best Animated Feature and the Annie Award for Best Animated Feature. Kōji Yamamura's Mt. Head was nominated for the Academy Award for Best Animated Short Film. Spirited Away also won the New York Film Critics Circle Award for Best Animated Film.

== Releases ==
=== Films ===
Release date	Title	Studio	Director(s)	Running time (minutes)	Japanese name
February 9	Turn A Gundam I: Earth Light	Sunrise	Yoshiyuki Tomino	128	Gekijō-ban ∀ Gandamu I chikyū hikari
February 10	Turn A Gundam II: Moonlight Butterfly	Sunrise	Yoshiyuki Tomino	128	Gekijō-ban ∀ Gandamu II gekkō chō
March 2	One Piece: Chopper Kingdom of Strange Animal Island	Toei Animation	Junji Shimizu	55	Wanpīsu chinjū shima no choppā ōkoku
March 2	Digimon Tamers: Runaway Locomon	Toei Animation	Tetsuharu Nakamura	30	Dejimon teimāzu bōsō dejimon tokkyū
March 9	Doraemon: Nobita in the Robot Kingdom	Shin-Ei Animation	Tsutomu Shibayama	81	Eiga Doraemon Nobita to robotto ōkoku [Kingu damu]
March 16	A Tree of Palme	Palm Studio	Takashi Nakamura	136	Parumu no ki
March 30	Patlabor Movie 3: WXIII	Madhouse	Fumihiko Takayama	100	WXIII kidō keisatsu patoreibā
April 20	Crayon Shin-chan: The Storm Called: The Battle of the Warring States	Shin-Ei Animation	Keiichi Hara	95	Eiga Crayon Shin-chan: Arashi wo Yobu Appare! Sengoku Dai Kassen
April 20	eX-Driver the Movie	Actas	Akira Nishimori	62	Ekusu doraibā the movie
April 20	Detective Conan: The Phantom of Baker Street	TMS Entertainment	Kenji Kodama	107	Meitantei Conan: Baker Street no Bourei
June 25	Armitage III: Dual-Matrix	AIC	Katsuhito Akiyama	90	Amitēji za sādo DUAL – matorikkusu
July 13	Pokémon Heroes	OLM	Kunihiko Yuyama	74	Poketto monsutā mizu no miyako no Mamoru-shin ratiasutoratiosu
July 20	The Cat Returns	Studio Ghibli	Hiroyuki Morita	75	Neko no Ongaeshi
August 17	Beyblade: Fierce Battle	Nippon Animation Synergy Japan	Takuo Suzuki	70	Bakuten shūto beiburēdo THE mūbī gekitō! ! Takao VS daichi
September 14	Millennium Actress	Madhouse	Satoshi Kon	86	Sennen Joyuu
October 19	Tamala 2010: A Punk Cat in Space		t.o.L	91	Tamara 2010 a panku kyatto in supēsu
November 20	Blue Gender: The Warrior	AIC	Koichi Oohata	98	BLUE GENDER THE WARRIOR
December 21	Inuyasha: The Castle Beyond the Looking Glass	Sunrise	Toshiya Shinohara	99	Inuyasha-kyō no naka no mugen-jō

=== Television series ===
First run start and end dates	Title	Episodes	Studio	Director(s)	Japanese name
January 5 – June 29	Secret of Cerulean Sand	26	Telecom Animation Film	Yuuichiro Yano	Patapata Hikousen no Bouken
January 6 – April 3, 2003	Panyo Panyo Di Gi Charat	48	Madhouse	Shigehito Takayanagi	Panyo panyo de ji kyaratto
January 7 – December 30	Beyblade V-Force	51	Nippon Animation	Yoshio Takeuchi	Bakuten Shoot Beyblade 2002
January 7 – April 8	Mirage of Blaze	13	Madhouse	Susumu Kudo	Honoo no Mirage
January 8 – June 18	Full Metal Panic!	24	Gonzo	Kouichi Chigira	Furumetaru panikku!
January 9 – December 25	Ultimate Muscle	51	Toei Animation	Toshiaki Komura	Kinnikuman II Sei
January 10 – March 28	Please Teacher!	12	Daume	Yasunori Ide	Onegai ☆ tīchā
January 10 – June 27	Nana Seven of Seven	25	A.C.G.T.	Yasuhiro Imagawa	Shichinin no Nana
January 11 – March 29	Aquarian Age: Sign for Evolution	13	Madhouse	Yoshimitsu Oohashi	Akuerian'eiji sain fō eborūshon
January 21 – September 11	RahXephon	26	Bones	Yutaka Izubuchi	Rāzefon
January 31 – March 28	Kanon	13	Toei Animation	Naoyuki Ito	Kanon (2002)
February 2 – May 11	Genma Wars	13	E&G Films	Tsuneo Tominaga	Genma taisen – shinwa zen'ya no shō
February 3 – January 26, 2003	Useless Witch Doremi Kaboom!	51	Toei Animation	Takuya Igarashi	Ojamajo doremi dokkan!
February 3 – March 31	Galaxy Angel Z	9	Madhouse	Morio Asaka	Gyarakushī enjeru Z
February 18 – September 2	Kick Off 2002	26	KBS Media	Kim Dae Jun	Kikku ofu 2002
March 4 – March 31, 2003	Rockman.EXE	56	Xebec	Takao Kato	Rokkuman eguze
March 28 – June 20	Gun Frontier	13	Vega Entertainment	Soichiro Zen	Gan furontia
March 29 – September 13	Psychic Academy	24	E&G Films	Shigeru Yamazaki	Saikikku akademī kirara banshō
April 1 – June 30	Happy☆Lesson	13	Studio Hibari	Iku Suzuki	HAPPY☆LESSON
April 2 – September 24	Tokyo Underground	26	Pierrot	Hayato Date	Tōkyō andāguraundo
April 2 – September 25	Tenchi Muyou! GXP	26	AIC	Shinichi Watanabe	Tenchimuyō! GXP
April 3 – September 25	Chobits	26	Madhouse	Morio Asaka	Chobittsu
April 3 – December 22	Rizelmine	24	Madhouse Imagin	Yasuhiro Matsumura	Rizerumain
April 4 – September 26	.hack//Sign	26	Bee Train	Koichi Mashimo	.hack//SIGN
April 4 – June 27	Magical☆Shopping Arcade Abenobashi	13	Madhouse	Masayuki Kojima	Abeno-bashi mahō ☆ shōten machi
April 5 – December 27	Daigunder	39	Brain's Base	Hiroyuki Yano	Bakutōsengen daigandā
April 6 – September 28	Forza! Hidemaru	26	Gallop	Yoshihiro Takamoto	Forutsu~a! Hidemaru
April 6 – September 27, 2005	Mirmo Zibang!	172	Studio Hibari	Kenichi Kasai	Wagamama ☆ fearī mirumo de pon!
April 6 – March 29, 2003	Searching for the Full Moon	52	Studio Deen	Toshiyuki Kato	Mangetsu wo sagashite
April 6 – March 29, 2003	Tokyo Mew Mew	52	Pierrot	Noriyuki Abe	Tōkyō myūmyū
April 7 – March 30, 2003	Lightning Super Express Hikarian	52	Tokyo Kids	Hideaki Ooba	Denkou Chou Tokkyuu Hikarian
April 7 – March 30, 2003	Cheeky Angel	50	TMS Entertainment	Masaharu Okuwaki	Tenshi na Konamaiki
April 7 – March 30, 2003	Digimon Frontier	50	Toei Animation	Yukio Kaizawa	Dejimon furontia
April 7 – September 29	Pita Ten	26	Madhouse	Toshifumi Kawase	Pitaten
April 9 – October 1	Azumanga Daioh The Animation	26	J.C.Staff	Hiroshi Nishikiori	Azumanga daiō the animēshon
April 9 – August 30, 2003	The Twelve Kingdoms	45	Pierrot	Tsuneo Kobayashi	Jūnikokuki
April 11 – September 26	Ai Yori Aoshi	24	J.C.Staff	Masami Shimoda	Bluer Than Indigo
April 19 – September 19, 2009	My Family	330	Shin-Ei Animation	Akitaro Daichi Tetsuo Yasumi	Atashinchi
May 6 – February 3, 2003	Whistle!	39	Studio Comet	Hiroshi Fukutomi	Hoissuru!
May 15 – August 14	Jing: King of Bandits	13	Studio Deen	Hiroshi Watanabe	Ōdorobō jing
July 2 – September 24	She, The Ultimate Weapon	13	Gonzo	Mitsuko Kase	Saishūheiki kanojo
July 2 – December 24	Samurai Deeper Kyo	26	Studio Deen	Junji Nishimura	SAMURAI DEEPER KYO
July 2 – October 1	G-On Riders	13	Shaft TNK	Shinichiro Kimura	G – on raidasu
July 3 – December 25	Witch Hunter Robin	26	Sunrise	Shuko Murase	Uitchi hantā robin
July 4 – September 19	UFO Princess Valkyrie	12	TNK	Shigeru Ueda	Enban kōjo warukiyure
July 4 – March 29, 2003	Fortune Dogs	39	Vega Entertainment	Hiroshi Saito	Fōchun doggusu
July 4 – December 26	Ground Defense Force! Mao-chan	26	Xebec	Yoshiaki Iwasaki	Rikujō bōeitai maochan
July 4 – December 26	Shrine of the Morning Mist	26	Chaos Project GANSIS	Yuuji Moriyama	Asagiri no miko
July 4 – March 27, 2003	Dragon Drive	38	Madhouse	Toshifumi Kawase	Doragon doraibu
August 16 – May 23, 2003	Princess Tutu	38	HAL Film Maker	Junichi Sato Kiyoko Sayama	Purinsesu chuchu
August 31 – November 23	Maou Dante	13	Magic Bus	Kenichi Maejima	Maō dante
September 7 – March 22, 2003	Overman King Gainer	26	Sunrise	Yoshiyuki Tomino	Ōbāman kingugeinā
September 11 – September 10, 2003	Hungry Heart: Wild Striker	52	Nippon Animation	Satoshi Saga	Hangurīhāto wairudo Striker
September 26 – January 16, 2003	Mahoromatic ~Something More Beautiful~	14	Gainax Shaft	Hiroyuki Yamaga	Mahoromatikku ~ motto utsukushī mono ~
September 30 – March 24, 2003	Petite Princess Yucie	26	Gainax AIC	Masahiko Ootsuka	Puchipuri* yūshii
October 1 – September 30, 2003	Monkey Typhoon	52	Studio Egg	Mamoru Hamatsu	Asobotto senki go kyū
October 1 – October 1, 2003	Ghost in the Shell: Stand Alone Complex	26	Production I.G	Kenji Kamiyama	Kōkakukidōtai STAND arōn konpurekkusu
October 1 – March 25, 2003	Spiral: The Bond of Reasoning	25	J.C.Staff	Mamoru Hosoda	Supairaru – suiri no kizuna -
October 2 – March 26, 2003	Hanada Shounen-shi	25	Madhouse	Masayuki Kojima	Hanadashōnenshi
October 2 – March 26, 2003	Heat Guy J	25	Satelight	Kazuki Akane	Hīto gai jei
October 2 – September 24, 2003	Bomberman Jetters	52	Studio Deen	Katsuyuki Kodera	Bonbāman jettāzu
October 3 – February 8, 2007	Naruto	220	Pierrot	Hayato Date	Naruto
October 4 – December 25	Sister Princess: Re Pure	13	Zexcs	Nagisa Miyazaki Tsubame Shimotaya	Shisutā purinsesu ~ ripyua ~
October 5 – September 27, 2003	Mobile Suit Gundam SEED	50	Sunrise	Mitsuo Fukuda	Kidō senshi Gandamu shīdo
October 5 – September 20, 2003	GetBackers	49	Studio Deen	Kazuhiro Furuhashi Keitaro Motonaga	Getto bakkāzu dakkan-ya
October 6 – March 31, 2003	Galaxy Angel 3	26	Madhouse	Shigehito Takayanagi	Gyarakushī enjeru A
October 8 – December 17	Super Heavy God Gravion	13	Gonzo	Masami Oobari	Chō omo kami guravuion
October 9 – March 19, 2003	Kiddy Grade	24	Gonzo	Keiji Gotoh	Kidi gureido
October 10 – December 19	Haibane Renmei	13	Radix	Tomokazu Tokoro	Haibanerenmei
November 2 – September 13, 2003	Diary of a Fishing Fool	36	Toei Animation	Tetsuo Imazawa	Tsuribakanisshi
November 11 – January 13, 2003	Piano: The Melody of a Young Girl's Heart	10	OLM	Norihiko Sudo	PIANO
November 21 – September 14, 2006	Pokemon Advanced Generation	192	OLM	Kunihiko Yuyama Masamitsu Hidaka Yuuji Asada	Poketto monsutā adobansu jenerēshon
November 28 – March 20, 2003	Knight Hunters Eternity	13	ufotable	Hitoyuki Matsui	Vuaisu kuroitsu gurīen

=== Original video animations ===
First run start and end dates	Title	Episodes	Studio	Director(s)	Japanese name
January 16	Detective Conan: 16 Suspects	1	TMS Entertainment	Yasuichiro Yamamoto	Meitantei Conan: 16-nin no Yougisha
January 17 – April 17	Hunter x Hunter: Original Video Animation	8	Nippon Animation	Satoshi Saga	HUNTER×HUNTER Original Video Animation
January 25	Digital Juice	6	Studio 4°C	Kouji Morimoto Osamu Kobayashi Tatsuyuki Tanaka Kazuyoshi Yaginuma	Dejitaru jūsu
January 26 – March 27	Love Hina Again	3	Xebec	Yoshiaki Iwasaki	Rabu hina agein
January 26	Gakuen Senki Muryou Special	1	Madhouse		Yorinuki muryō-san Girls serekushon ~ gakuensenki muryō tokubetsu-hen ~
January 31 – April 26	Shootfighter Tekken	3	AIC	Yukio Nishimoto	Kōkō tekken-den tafu
February 2	Voices of a Distant Star	1	CoMix Wave Films	Makoto Shinkai	Hoshi no koe
February 25 – January 25, 2003	Arcade Gamer Fubuki	4	Shaft	Yuuji Muto	Ākēdo gēmā fubuki
March 2 – July 3	Trava: Fist Planet	4	Madhouse	Katsuhito Ishii Takeshi Koike	TRAVA FIST PLANET
March 2 – July 1, 2006	Sweat Punch	5	Studio 4°C	Kazuto Nakazawa	Suuetto panchi
March 22	Canary	1	Soeishinsha	Keitaro Motonaga	Kanaria
March 25 – July 25	Otogi Story Tenshi no Shippo Specials	2	Tokyo Kids	Kazuhiro Ochi	O togi sutōrī tenshinoshippo
March 27 – January 23, 2003	In a Distant Time	2	Zexcs	Iku Suzuki	Harukanaru jikū no naka de 〜 ajisaiyumekatari 〜
March 27 – June 25, 2003	Angelique: Twin Collection	8	Yumeta Company		Anjerīku Twin korekushon
March 29 – July 26	Araiso Private High School Student Council Executive Committee	2	Nippon Animation	Shinji Sato	Shiritsu araiso kōtō gakkō seito-kai shikkō-bu
April 3	Lupin III: Return of Pycal	1	TMS Entertainment	Mamoru Hamatsu	Lupin III: Ikiteita Majutsushi
April 19	She and Her Cat: Their Standing Points	1	CoMix Wave Films	Makoto Shinkai	Kanojo to Kanojo no Neko
April 24 – January 8, 2003	Gate Keepers 21	6	Gonzo	Hiroshi Yamaguchi	Gēto kīpāzu 21
April 24	Galerians: Rion	3			Garerianzu: Rion
April 25	Galaxy Angel Music Collection: Shouen to Shien no Cassoulet	1	Madhouse	Morio Asaka Yoshimitsu Oohashi	Gyarakushī enjeru myūjikku korekushon shōen to shien no kasure
May 25 – October 26	Cosplay Complex	3	TNK	Shinichiro Kimura	Kosupure konpurekkusu
May 25	Megami Kouhosei Special Curriculum	1	Xebec	Shinichi Yamaoka	Megami kōhosei supesharu karikyuramu
May 25	Mahou no Star Magical Emi: Kumo Hikaru	1	Ajia-do	Takashi Anno	Mahō no sutā majikaru emi kumo hikaru
June 20 – April 10, 2003	.hack//Liminality	4	Bee Train	Koichi Mashimo	.hack//LIMINALITY
July 26 – January 22, 2004	Futari Ecchi	4	Chaos Project	Yuuji Moriyama	Futari etchi
August 6	Ultra Maniac	1	Ashi Productions	Shinichi Masaki Nanako Shimazaki	Urutora maniakku
August 23 – April 2, 2004	Nurse Witch Komugi-chan Magikarte	5	Kyoto Animation Tatsunoko Production	Yasuhiro Takemoto	Nāsuu~itchi komugi-chan majikarute
August 25 – August 26, 2005	Yukikaze	5	Gonzo	Masahiko Ookura	Sentō yōsei yukikaze
August 25 – January 25, 2003	Haré+Guu Deluxe	6	Shin-Ei Animation	Tsutomu Mizushima	Janguru haitsu moharenochiguu derakkusu
September 19	Saiyuki Interactive	1	Pierrot		Gensōmadensaiyūki – kibō no zaika -
September 20	Mega Man: Wishing upon a Star	3	Ashi Productions	Katsumi Minoguchi	Rokku man hoshininegaiwo
September 27	Ichi The Killer: Episode 0	1	AIC	Shinji Ishihira	Koroshi-ya 1 THE animēshon EPISODE 0
October 25	Please Teacher!: Secret Couple	1	Daume		Onegai ☆ tīchā himitsunafutari
October 25	Vandread: Gekitou-hen	1	Gonzo	Shinji Higuchi	Vuandoreddo gekitō-hen
November 9 – July 25, 2003	Saint Seiya: The Hades Chapter – Sanctuary	13	Toei Animation	Shigeyasu Yamauchi	Seitō shiseiya meiō hādesu jūnikyū-hen
December 9 – March 19, 2003	I''s	2	Pierrot Arms	Shigenori Kageyama	Furomuaizu ~ mō hitotsu no natsu no monogatari ~
December 13 – June 27, 2003	Happy World!	3	Zexcs	Takashi Ikehata	Happy World!
December 18	Sakura Taisen: Sumire	1	Radix	Hitoyuki Matsui	"Sakura taisen"~ kanzaki sumire intai kinen ~`su mi re'
December 18 – March 26, 2003	I'll/CKBC	2	M.S.C	Itsuro Kawasaki	I'll/CKBC
December 20	Green Green	1	Media Factory		Gurīn gurīn
December 21 – December 21, 2003	Space Pirate Captain Herlock: The Endless Odyssey	13	Madhouse	Rintaro	SPACE PIRATE CAPTAIN HERLOCK OUTSIDE LEGEND ~The Endless Odyssey~
December 21 – October 20, 2004	Macross Zero	5	Satelight	Shoji Kawamori	Makurosu zero
December 27	Wind: A Breath of Heart	1	Ajia-do	Sata	Wind -a breath of heart-
	Kojin Taxi	5			
	Shokuzai no Kyoushitsu	2			
	Shintaisou: Kari	4			
	Flutter of Birds: Tori-tachi no Habataki	2			
	D+vine Luv	4			
	Little Monica Monogatari	2			

== See also ==
- 2002 in animation
