= Charlie Mills (animator) =

British animator

- Born: 1954 (age 70–71); Bristol, England
- Occupation: Animator
- Years active: 1984-present

Charlie Mills (born 1954) is an English animator known for creating The Trap Door and Stoppit and Tidyup with Terry Brain. He and Brain had a company named CMTB Animations.
