= 2002 in animation =

2002 in animation is an overview of notable events, including notable awards, list of films released, television show debuts and endings, and notable deaths.

== Events ==
=== January ===
- January 19: The first episode of Teamo Supremo airs.
- January 21:
  - The first episode of Cyberchase airs.
  - Daria ends with Is It College Yet?, which served as the series finale.

=== February ===
- February 14: Family Guy concludes its third season on Fox with the episode "Family Guy Viewer Mail #1", which was seen by over 4 million viewers that night. This was meant to be the final episode to air on Fox as the network originally planned to cancel the show, but they ended up deciding to revive the show in 2005 after discovering the show's DVD sales & high ratings on Adult Swim.
- February 19: Balto II: Wolf Quest, the direct-to-video sequel to Balto, was released after being delayed for two years.
- Late February: Cartoon Network releases a tribute to animator Chuck Jones during commercial breaks, as Jones died on February 22.

=== March ===
- March 1: Season 2 of The Fairly OddParents begins on Nickelodeon with the premiere of the episodes "Boys in the Band/Hex Games". The season's premiere was seen by just over 3.1 million viewers that night.
- March 2: The first episode of Mr. Bean: The Animated Series airs, an animated TV series based on Rowan Atkinson's Mr. Bean.
- March 6: Season 6 of South Park begins on Comedy Central with the premiere of the episode "Jared Has Aides". It was seen by over 3 million viewers that night.
- March 12: Tom and Jerry: The Magic Ring releases on VHS and DVD. This was the first Tom and Jerry project to be produced by Warner Bros. Animation after the closure of Hanna-Barbera last year.
- March 15: Blue Sky Studios releases Ice Age, directed by Chris Wedge, which becomes a surprise hit.
- March 16: Larryboy: The Cartoon Adventures is released on direct-to-video.
- March 22: The first episode of ChalkZone airs.
- March 24: 74th Academy Awards:
  - The first Academy Award for Best Animated Feature is awarded. The winner is Shrek, produced by DreamWorks Animation.
  - For the Birds, directed by Ralph Eggleston and produced by Pixar, wins the Academy Award for Best Animated Short.
  - "If I Didn't Have You" from Monsters, Inc. by Randy Newman wins the Academy Award for Best Original Song.
- March 31: The Simpsons episode "Blame It on Lisa" premieres, wherein the family travels to Brazil, which leads to controversy in Brazil.

=== April ===
- April 1: Noggin was divided into two different blocks: a 12-hour extension of the channel's preschool block, and The N was launched, targeted at pre-teens and teenagers.

=== May ===
- May 1: Nicktoons was launched.
- May 3: The first episode of Max & Ruby airs in Canada. In the United States, the series premiered on October 21, 2002.
- May 4: The first episode of Angelina Ballerina airs.
- May 12: King of the Hill concludes its sixth season on Fox with the two-part finale "Returning Japanese (Part I & II)". It was seen by just over 4.9 million viewers that night.
- May 16: 2002 Cannes Film Festival: Michael Moore's documentary Bowling for Columbine premieres, which also has an animated segment A Brief History of the United States of America. The scene is animated by Flicker Lab, but often mistaken for being made by the South Park crew, particularly since Matt Stone is interviewed in the film, moments before the segment takes place.
- May 22: The Simpsons concludes its 13th season on Fox with the episode "Poppa's Got a Brand New Badge". It was seen by over 8.1 million viewers that night.

=== June ===
- June 7: Disney Channel broadcasts the first three episodes of Kim Possible.
- June 17: The SpongeBob SquarePants episode "Gary Takes a Bath" premieres on Nicktoons (the episode would later make its premiere on Nickelodeon the following year).
- June 21: The Walt Disney Company releases Lilo & Stitch. This movie was commercially acclaimed and became an unexpected phenomenon.
- June 28: Paramount Pictures and Nickelodeon release Hey Arnold!: The Movie it received poor reception during the release.

=== July ===
- July 2: George Michael's animated music video Shoot the Dog is released, satirizing various celebrities, among them president George W. Bush and UK Prime Minister Tony Blair, with animation by 2DTV.
- July 3: The Powerpuff Girls Movie is first released, but it was a box office bomb, causing Cartoon Network to never make a theatrical film again.
- July 13: Pokémon Heroes premieres.
- July 20:
  - Hiroyuki Morita's The Cat Returns premieres.
  - The first episode of The Adventures of Jimmy Neutron: Boy Genius airs.

=== August ===
- August 17: The first episode of ¡Mucha Lucha! airs.
- August 24: The first episode of Henry's World airs.

=== September ===
- September 2: The first episode of Make Way for Noddy airs.
- September 14: The first episode of Fillmore!, produced by the Walt Disney Company, airs.

=== October ===
- October 18: Grim & Evil concludes its first season on Cartoon Network with the episodes "Little Rock of Horrors/The Pie Who Loved Me/Dream a Little Dream". Its segments, The Grim Adventures of Billy & Mandy and Evil Con Carne ended up airing as their own shows for the premiere of its second season.

=== November ===
- November 2: The first episode of Clone High airs.
- November 3:
  - Season 14 of The Simpsons begins on Fox with the latest Treeehouse of Horror installment "Treehouse of Horror XIII". It was seen by over 16.6 million viewers that night.
  - Season 7 of King of the Hill begins on Fox with the episode "Get Your Freak Off". It was seen by over 13 million viewers that night.
- November 8:
  - Season 3 of The Fairly OddParents begins on Nickelodeon (ahead of its second season's finale) with the premiere of the episodes "Ruled Out/That's Life!". The season's premiere was seen by just over 3.1 million viewers that night.
  - The film Muhammad: The Last Prophet is first released by Richard Rich in Turkey.
- November 22: The first episode of Lauras Stern airs.
- November 27:
  - The Walt Disney Company releases Treasure Planet. This marks the suspension of PG-rated cartoons by Disney until Teacher's Pet in January 2004 as a result of releasing majority of PG-rated cartoons from the past months of this year as Disney insisted of "bringing back" the G-rated cartoons to the big screen next year, starting with Jungle Book 2.
  - The film Eight Crazy Nights is released, which stars an animated version of Adam Sandler and takes place at Chanukah. It was lambasted by critics for its excessive lewd humor and becomes a box office bomb.

=== December ===
- December 1: The Simpsons episode "Helter Shelter" premieres on Fox, this was the final episode of the show to be produced entirely in cel animation, the show officially switches over to digital ink and paint afterwards.
- December 6: The first episode of Codename: Kids Next Door airs on Cartoon Network.
- December 11: South Park concludes its sixth season on Comedy Central with the Christmas special "Red Sleigh Down", which was seen by nearly 2 million viewers that night. At the end of the episode, Kenny surprisingly returns to the show after being dead for exactly a year.
- December 17: Beauty and the Beast and Why Man Creates are added to the National Film Registry.
- December 20: The Wild Thornberrys Movie premieres, receiving generally positive reviews.
- December 26: The Japanese animation studio Feel is founded.
- December 29: Aqua Teen Hunger Force concludes its first season on Adult Swim with the Christmas special "Cybernetic Ghost of Christmas Past from the Future".

== Awards ==
- Academy Award for Best Animated Feature: Shrek
- Academy Award for Best Animated Short Film: For the Birds
- Animation Kobe Feature Film Award: The Cat Returns
- Annecy International Animated Film Festival Cristal du long métrage: My Beautiful Girl, Mari
- Annie Award for Best Animated Feature: Spirited Away
- Goya Award for Best Animated Film: Dragon Hill, la colina del dragón
- Japan Media Arts Festival Animation Award: Crayon Shin-chan: The Storm Called: The Battle of the Warring States
- Mainichi Film Awards - Animation Grand Award: Crayon Shin-chan: The Storm Called: The Battle of the Warring States

== Films released ==
- January 18 - My Beautiful Girl, Mari (South Korea)
- January 21 - Is It College Yet? (United States)
- February 9 - Turn A Gundam I: Earth Light (Japan)
- February 10 - Turn A Gundam II: Moonlight Butterfly (Japan)
- February 15 - Return to Never Land (United States)
- February 19 - Balto II: Wolf Quest (United States)
- February 21 - Song of the Miraculous Hind (Hungary)
- February 26 - Cinderella II: Dreams Come True (United States)
- March 2 - One Piece: Chopper's Kingdom on the Island of Strange Animals (Japan)
- March 9 - Doraemon: Nobita in the Robot Kingdom (Japan)
- March 10 - A Tree of Palme (Japan)
- March 12 - Tom and Jerry: The Magic Ring (United States)
- March 15 - Ice Age (United States)
- March 19 - The Hunchback of Notre Dame II (United States)
- March 21 - Tytus, Romek and A'Tomek Versus the Thieves of Dreams (Poland)
- March 30 - WXIII: Patlabor (Japan)
- April 3 - Tristan & Isolde (France and Luxembourg)
- April 20:
  - Crayon Shin-chan: The Storm Called: The Battle of the Warring States (Japan)
  - Detective Conan: The Phantom of Baker Street (Japan)
- April 27 - Báječná show (Czech Republic)
- May 15 - Initial D: Battle Stage (Japan)
- May 24 - Spirit: Stallion of the Cimarron (United States)
- June 21 - Lilo & Stitch (United States)
- June 27 - Ogu and Mampato in Rapa Nui (Chile)
- June 28 - Hey Arnold!: The Movie (United States)
- July 3 - The Powerpuff Girls Movie (United States)
- July 6 - 6 Angels (Japan)
- July 13 - Pokémon Heroes (Japan)
- July 20 - The Cat Returns (Japan)
- July 23 - Tarzan & Jane (United States)
- July 26 - Alibaba (India)
- August 6 - The Adventures of Tom Thumb & Thumbelina (United States)
- August 12 - Rolie Polie Olie: The Great Defender of Fun (Canada and France)
- August 16 - The Princess and the Pea (United States and Hungary)
- August 17 - Beyblade: Fierce Battle (Japan)
- September 3 - Mickey's House of Villains (United States)
- September 20 - Eden (Poland)
- September 25 - Corto Maltese: La cour secrète des Arcanes (France, Italy, and Luxembourg)
- September 27 - Karlsson on the Roof (Sweden and Norway)
- October 1 - Barbie as Rapunzel (United States)
- October 3 - Mercano, the Martian (Argentina)
- October 4:
  - Johan Padan and the Discovery of the Americas (Italy)
  - Jonah: A VeggieTales Movie (United States)
- October 6 - Inspector Gadget's Last Case (United States)
- October 9 - Kwentong kayumanggi (Philippines)
- October 13 - Sabrina: Friends Forever (United States)
- October 19 - Tamala 2010: A Punk Cat in Space (Japan)
- October 20 - Time Kid (United States)
- October 27 - Dennis the Menace: Cruise Control (United States)
- October 28 - VeggieTales: The Star of Christmas (United States)
- November - S.O.S. Planet (United States and Belgium)
- November 3 - The Archies in JugMan (United States)
- November 8 - Muhammad: The Last Prophet (United States)
- November 10 - Dinosaur Island (United States)
- November 12 - Winnie the Pooh: A Very Merry Pooh Year (United States)
- November 17 - My Fair Madeline (United States)
- November 20 - Blue Gender: The Warrior (Japan)
- November 24 - Groove Squad (United States)
- November 27:
  - Eight Crazy Nights (United States)
  - Treasure Planet (United States)
- November 28 - Fimfárum (Czech Republic)
- December - Time Gate (Spain)
- December 1 - Treasure Island (United States)
- December 5:
  - Anjé: The Legend of the Pyrenees (Spain)
  - The Little Polar Bear: Lars and the Little Tiger (Germany)
- December 10 - The Land Before Time IX: Journey to Big Water (United States)
- December 14 - Hamtaro: The Captive Princess (Japan)
- December 15 - Globehunters: An Around the World in 80 Days Adventure (United States) (produced in 2000)
- December 18 - The Boy Who Wanted to Be a Bear (Denmark and France)
- December 20:
  - Dragon Hill (Spain)
  - The Wild Thornberrys Movie (United States)
- December 21 - InuYasha the Movie: The Castle Beyond the Looking Glass (Japan)
- December 22 - The Amazing Zorro (United States)
- December 29 - 20,000 Leagues Under The Sea (United States)
- Specific date unknown:
  - Birdvillage: Second Nest (United States)
  - Holy Fox (Georgia)

== Television series debuts ==
Date	Title	Channel	Year
January 9	Butt-Ugly Martians	Nickelodeon	2002–2003
January 19	Teamo Supremo	ABC, Toon Disney	2002–2004
January 21	Cyberchase	PBS Kids	2002–present
February 23	Mobile Suit Gundam 0083: Stardust Memory	Adult Swim	2002
February 23	Pilot Candidate	Adult Swim	2002
February 23	Yu Yu Hakusho	Adult Swim	2002–2006
March 2	Mr. Bean: The Animated Series	ITV1, CITV	2002–present
March 22	ChalkZone	Nickelodeon	2002–2008
April 1	Play with Me Sesame	Noggin	2002–2007
April 7	Super Duper Sumos	Nickelodeon	2002–2003
May 4	Angelina Ballerina	PBS Kids	2002–2006
May 16	Eye Drops	TechTV	2002
May 25	Phantom Investigators	Kids' WB	2002
June 3	Hamtaro	Cartoon Network	2002–2004
June 7	Kim Possible	Disney Channel	2002–2007
July 19	Whatever Happened to... Robot Jones?	Cartoon Network	2002–2003
July 20	The Adventures of Jimmy Neutron, Boy Genius	Nickelodeon	2002–2006
August 16	He-Man and the Masters of the Universe	Cartoon Network	2002–2004
August 17	¡Mucha Lucha!	Cartoon Network	2002–2005
August 23	Transformers: Armada	Cartoon Network	2002–2003
August 31	Inuyasha	Adult Swim	2002–2013
September 2	Liberty's Kids	PBS Kids	2002–2003
September 7	Toad Patrol	Toon Disney	2002
September 14	What's New, Scooby-Doo?	Kids' WB	2002–2005
September 14	Ozzy & Drix	Kids' WB	2002–2004
September 14	Pokémon: Master Quest	Kids' WB	2002–2003
September 14	Fillmore!	ABC	2002–2004
September 14	Fighting Foodons	FoxBox	2002–2003
September 14	Kirby: Right Back at Ya!	FoxBox	2002–2006
September 14	Stargate Infinity	FoxBox	2002–2003
September 14	Ultraman Tiga	FoxBox	2002–2003
September 14	Ultimate Muscle	FoxBox	2002–2004
October 21	Max & Ruby	Treehouse TV (Canada); Nick Jr. (US)	2002–2020
November 2	Clone High	MTV	2002–2003
November 7	3-South	MTV	2002–2003
November 4	Girlstuff/Boystuff	YTV	2002–2003
December 6	Codename: Kids Next Door	Cartoon Network	2002–2008
December 9	Wick Wick Plant	TF1	2002-2003

== Television series endings ==
Date	Title	Channel	Year	Notes
January 8	The PJs	The WB	1999–2002	Ended
January 15	Max Steel	Kids' WB	2000–2002	Ended
January 21	Daria	MTV	1997–2002	Ended
January 26	Marvin the Tap-Dancing Horse	PBS Kids	2000–2002	Cancelled
February 10	Action League Now!	Nickelodeon	2001–2002	Cancelled
February 13	Dr. Katz, Professional Therapist	Comedy Central	1995–2002	Ended
February 24	Anne of Green Gables: The Animated Series	PBS Kids	2001–2002	Ended
March 10	Baby Blues	The WB, Adult Swim	2000–2002	Cancelled
March 23	Harold and the Purple Crayon	HBO	2001–2002	Cancelled
March 28	The New Woody Woodpecker Show	Fox Kids	1999–2002	Ended
April 7	Sheep in the Big City	Cartoon Network	2000–2002	Ended
May 10	Teacher's Pet	Toon Disney	2000–2002	Ended
May 11	Pilot Candidate	Adult Swim	2002	Cancelled
June 9	Maggie and the Ferocious Beast	Nick Jr	2000–2002	Ended
June 15	The Tex Avery Show	Cartoon Network	1996–2002	Ended
June 22	Alienators: Evolution Continues	Fox Kids	2001–2002	Cancelled
June 29	Mary-Kate and Ashley in Action!	ABC	2001–2002	Cancelled
June 29	Phantom Investigators	Kids' WB	2002	Cancelled
August 8	Eye Drops	TechTV	2002	Cancelled
August 10	The Zeta Project	Kids' WB	2001–2002	Cancelled
August 11	Mission Hill	Adult Swim	1999–2002	Cancelled
September 7	Pokémon: Johto League Champions	Kids' WB	2001–2002	Ended
October 5	Sagwa, the Chinese Siamese Cat	PBS Kids	2001–2002	Ended
November 10	The Oblongs	Adult Swim	2001–2002	Ended
November 15	Pelswick	Nickelodeon	2000–2002	Ended
November 22	Courage the Cowardly Dog	Cartoon Network	1999–2002	Ended
November 24	Toad Patrol	Toon Disney	2002	Cancelled
December 10	Invader Zim	Nickelodeon	2001–2002	Cancelled, remaining episodes were released on DVD in 2004 and would eventually air on Nicktoons Network in 2006.
December 18	The Sylvester & Tweety Mysteries	Kids' WB	1995–2002	Ended
Specific date unknown	Mobile Suit Gundam 0083: Stardust Memory	Adult Swim	2002	Cancelled
Specific date unknown	The URL with Phred Show	Noggin	2001–2002	Ended

== Television season premieres ==
Date	Title	Season	Channel
February 10	Futurama	4	Fox
February 11	As Told by Ginger	2	Nickelodeon
February 13	Dora the Explorer	2	Nickelodeon
March 1	The Fairly OddParents	2	Nickelodeon
March 1	Samurai Jack	2	Cartoon Network
March 6	South Park	6	Comedy Central
September 6	Courage the Cowardly Dog	4	Cartoon Network
September 27	Ed, Edd n Eddy	4	Cartoon Network
September 27	The Proud Family	2	Disney Channel
October 18	Samurai Jack	3	Cartoon Network
November 3	King of the Hill	7	Fox
November 3	The Simpsons	14	Fox
November 8	The Fairly OddParents	3	Nickelodeon
November 22	Dexter's Laboratory	4	Cartoon Network
December 6	The Powerpuff Girls	5	Cartoon Network

== Television season finales ==
Date	Title	Season	Channel
April 26	ChalkZone	1	Nickelodeon
May 12	King of the Hill	6	Fox
May 18	The Powerpuff Girls	4	Cartoon Network
May 22	The Simpsons	13	Fox
May 24	The Proud Family	1	Disney Channel
July 12	Ed, Edd n Eddy	3	Cartoon Network
August 9	Courage the Cowardly Dog	3	Cartoon Network
September 13	Whatever Happened to... Robot Jones?	1	Cartoon Network
September 27	Dexter's Laboratory	3	Cartoon Network
October 11	Samurai Jack	2	Cartoon Network
October 18	Grim & Evil	1	Cartoon Network
December 8	Futurama	3	Fox
December 11	South Park	6	Comedy Central
December 29	Aqua Teen Hunger Force	1	Adult Swim (Cartoon Network)

== Births ==
=== February ===
- February 4: Graham Verchere, Canadian actor (voice of Pipsqueak and Chipcutter in My Little Pony: Friendship Is Magic).

=== March ===
- March 4: Jacob Hopkins, American actor (voice of Axel Finke in DreamWorks Dragons: Rescue Riders, Fushi in To Your Eternity, Andrew in The Loud House episode "Lincoln Loud Girl Guru", continued voice of Gumball Watterson in The Amazing World of Gumball).

=== April ===
- April 8: Skai Jackson, American actress (voice of Madison in Kick Buttowski: Suburban Daredevil, Little Fish in Bubble Guppies, Glory Grant in Marvel Rising, Summer in DreamWorks Dragons: Rescue Riders, Zuri Ross in the Ultimate Spider-Man episode "Halloween Night at the Museum", continued voice of Isa in Dora the Explorer).
- April 17: Justin Felbinger, American voice actor (voice of Miles Callisto in seasons 2-3 of Miles from Tomorrowland, Sprig Plantar in Amphibia, Jack B. Nimble in Goldie & Bear, Mtoto in The Lion Guard, Nate Cosay in Infinity Train, Danny Petrosky in The Boss Baby: Back in Business, Zac in Shimmer and Shine, young Surly in The Nut Job 2: Nutty by Nature, Alex in Spirit Riding Free, Justin in the American Dad! episode "The Bitchin' Race", Ralphie in The Casagrandes episode "Arr in the Family", Dungeon Doug in the Summer Camp Island episode "Dungeon Doug").
- April 26: Kristen Li, American actress (voice of Bubbles in The Powerpuff Girls and the Teen Titans Go! episode "TTG v PPG", Tanis the Mummy in the OK K.O.! Let's Be Heroes episode "Monster Party", Li in the Where's Waldo? episode "Little Trouble in Big China", additional voices in Monsters University).
- April 29: Grace Kaufman, American actress and daughter of David Kaufman (voice of Deema in seasons 3 and 4 of Bubble Guppies, Chelsea Keezheekoni in Clarence, Melody Mouse in Mickey Mouse Mixed-Up Adventures).

=== May ===
- May 6: Emily Alyn Lind, American actress (voice of Grace Goodwin in Prep & Landing: Naughty vs. Nice).
- May 8: Ethan Wacker, American actor (voice of Stinky in The Stinky & Dirty Show, Pipp Whipley in Miles from Tomorrowland).

=== June ===
- June 3: Eva Bella, American actress (voice of Shimmer in Shimmer and Shine, young Kayo in The Wind Rises, young Elsa in the Frozen franchise, Bloom in Whisker Haven, young Sue in Bling, Kid in the Family Guy episode "Pal Stewie").
- June 17: Merit Leighton, American actress (voice of Lucinda in Sofia the First, Frosta in She-Ra and the Princesses of Power, Eliza Moreno in the Spirit Riding Free episode "Lucky and the Dressage Sabotage").

=== July ===
- July 24: Benjamin Flores Jr., American actor and rapper (voice of Atticus in Happy Feet Two, Gerald Johanssen in Hey Arnold!: The Jungle Movie).

=== August ===
- August 1: Oona Laurence, American actress (voice of Hedgehog in Summer Camp Island).

=== September ===
- September 8: Gaten Matarazzo, American actor (voice of Bubba in The Angry Birds Movie 2, Boris the Dragon in My Father's Dragon).
- September 22: Humberto Vélez Jr., Mexican voice actor and son of Humberto Vélez (dub voice of Andy Hopper in Let's Go Luna!, Yushiro in Demon Slayer: Kimetsu no Yaiba, Dolph Starbeam in season 32-present of The Simpsons, Kareem Abdul-Jabbar Brown in The Proud Family: Louder and Prouder).
- September 27: Jenna Ortega, American actress (voice of Isabel in Elena of Avalor, Brooklynn in Jurassic World Camp Cretaceous, Gabriella Espinosa in Big City Greens).

=== October ===
- October 26: Julian Dennison, New Zealand actor (voice of Pierce in The Strange Chores).

=== December ===
- December 23: Finn Wolfhard, Canadian actor and musician (voice of Herbert West in Howard Lovecraft and the Kingdom of Madness, Player in Carmen Sandiego, Pugsley Addams in The Addams Family, Candlewick in Pinocchio, Bliblie in the Smiling Friends episode "Desmond's Big Day Out", Boypunzel in the JJ Villard's Fairy Tales episode "Boypunzel", Jeremy/Norman in the Duncanville episode "Das Banana Boot", Teen Scott Pilgrim in Scott Pilgrim Takes Off episode "Ramona Rents a Video").

== Deaths ==
=== January ===
- January 7: Avery Schreiber, American actor and comedian (voice of Tubbs in Pound Puppies, Benny the Ball in Top Cat and the Beverly Hills Cats, Beanie the Brain-Dead Bison in Animaniacs), dies at age 66.
- January 12: Ernest Pintoff, American animator and film director (The Violinist, The Critic), dies at age 70.
- January 16: Ron Taylor, American actor, singer and writer (voice of Bleeding Gums Murphy in The Simpsons, Mugsy and Bruno in Rover Dangerfield, Orderly in the Batman: The Animated Series episode "Dreams in Darkness", Ibalo in the Aaahh!!! Real Monsters episode "The Switching Hour"), dies from a heart attack at age 49.
- January 17: Queenie Leonard, English actress (voice of Bird in Tree in Alice in Wonderland, Princess in One Hundred and One Dalmatians), dies at age 96.
- January 20: Joe Mazzuca, American television producer (Filmation, Marvel Productions, Hanna-Barbera), dies at age 66.
- January 21: Peggy Lee, American singer and voice actress (voice of Darling, Si and Am and Peg in Lady and the Tramp), dies at age 81.
- January 22: Sheldon Allman, American-Canadian actor (voice of Big H in CB Bears), signer, and songwriter (theme from George of the Jungle), dies at age 77.
- January 28: Astrid Lindgren, Swedish children's book author and writer (creator of Pippi Longstocking), dies at age 94.

=== February ===
- February 13: Waylon Jennings, American singer, songwriter and musician (voice of Judge Thatcher in Tom Sawyer, the Balladeer in The Angry Beavers episode "The Legend of Kid Friendly", himself in the Family Guy episodes "Chitty Chitty Death Bang" and "To Love and Die in Dixie"), dies from complications of diabetes at age 64.
- February 22: Chuck Jones, American animator, director and painter (Warner Bros. Cartoons, MGM Animation/Visual Arts, directed the animated scenes in Stay Tuned and Mrs. Doubtfire, creator of Timber Wolf), dies from heart failure at age 89.
- February 26: Lawrence Tierney, American actor (voice of Rick in The Oz Kids, Don Brodka in The Simpsons episode "Marge Be Not Proud"), dies from pneumonia at age 82.

=== March ===
- March 12: Vitaly Peskov, Russian caricaturist, illustrator, animator and film director, dies at age 57.
- March 17: Rosetta LeNoire, American voice actress (voice of Big Bertha in Fritz the Cat), dies at age 90.
- March 27: Dudley Moore, English actor, comedian, musician and composer (voice of George - The Second Border Guard in The Hat, A. Square in Flatland, Spin in Really Wild Animals, Oscar in Oscar's Orchestra, Carl Denham and the title character in The Mighty Kong), dies at age 66.
- March 31: Marvin Goldhar, Canadian actor (voice of Cedric Sneer in The Racoons), dies at age 68.

=== May ===
- May 5: George Sidney, American film director and producer (Anchors Aweigh, co-founder of Hanna-Barbera), dies at age 85.
- May 7: Bob Onorato, American animator (Garfield and Friends, Pinky and the Brain), character designer (Adventures from the Book of Virtues) and storyboard artist (Hanna-Barbera, The Spooktacular New Adventures of Casper, Disney Television Animation, The New Woody Woodpecker Show, What's New, Scooby-Doo?, Harvey Birdman, Attorney at Law), dies at age 48.
- May 11: Bill Peet, American children's book illustrator, writer and animator (Walt Disney Animation Studios), dies at age 87.
- May 19: Earl Hammond, American actor (voice of Mumm-Ra in ThunderCats, Mon*Star in Silverhawks), dies at age 80.
- May 20: Stephen Jay Gould, American paleontologist, evolutionary biologist and science historian (voiced himself in The Simpsons episode "Lisa the Skeptic"), dies from metastatic cancer at age 60.
- May 24: Joseph Bau, Polish-Israeli artist, philosopher, comedian, poet and animator, dies at age 81.

=== June ===
- June 13: Vincent Fago, American comic book artist and animator (Fleischer Studios), dies at age 83.
- June 24: Bernard Longpré, Canadian animator and animated director (Monsieur Pointu), dies at age 65.
- June 27: John Entwistle, English musician and member of the Who (voiced himself in The Simpsons episode "A Tale of Two Springfields"), dies from a drug-induced heart attack at age 57.

=== July ===
- July 8: Ward Kimball, American animator (Walt Disney Company) and one of Disney's Nine Old Men, dies at age 88.
- July 9: Rod Steiger, American actor (voice of Captain Tenille in The Simpsons episode "Simpson Tide", himself in The Critic episode "L.A. Jay"), dies from pneumonia and kidney failure at age 77.
- July 24: Maurice Denham, English actor (voice of all animals in Animal Farm), dies at age 92.
- July 26:
  - Buddy Baker, American composer (Walt Disney Animation Studios, Bon Voyage, Charlie Brown (and Don't Come Back!), The Puppetoon Movie), dies at age 84.
  - Kenny Gardner, American singer and actor (voice of Dick in Mr. Bug Goes to Town), dies at age 89.

=== August ===
- August 5:
  - Josh Ryan Evans, American actor (voice of Third Grader in the Hey Arnold! episode "Big Gino", Small Boy and Lottsatot #2 in the Rugrats episode "No Place Like Home"), dies from a congenital heart condition at age 20.
  - Chick Hearn, American sportscaster (voice of The Announcer in Sport Goofy in Soccermania, Chick Mouse in the Garfield and Friends episode "Basket Brawl", Announcer in the Life with Louie episode "The Masked Chess Boy", himself in The Simpsons episode "Homer Defined", and the Duckman episode "Vuuck, as in Duck"), dies from a head injury from a fall at age 85.

=== September ===
- September 11: Johnny Unitas, American football quarterback (voiced himself in The Simpsons episode "Homie the Clown"), dies from a heart attack at age 69.

=== October ===
- October 13: Keene Curtis, American actor (voice of Lord Balthazar in The Smurfs, the Pastmaster in SWAT Kats: The Radical Squadron), dies at age 79.
- October 21: George Hall, Canadian actor (additional voices in Courage the Cowardly Dog), dies from a stroke at age 85.
- October 25: Richard Harris, Irish actor and singer (portrayed Gulliver in Gulliver's Travels, voice of Opaz in Kaena: The Prophecy), dies from hodgkin's disease at age 72.
- October 29: Glenn McQueen, Canadian animator (Pixar), dies from complications of melanoma cancer at age 41.

=== November ===
- November 3: Jonathan Harris, American actor (voice of Professor Jones in Freakazoid!, Manny in A Bug's Life, Geri the Cleaner in Toy Story 2, Count Blogg in Rainbow Brite, Grumblebee in Pinocchio and the Emperor of the Night, Sunflower in Happily Ever After, Athos in The Three Musketeers, Lance Lyons in Foofur, the Devil in The Mask, Stickley Rickets in Channel Umptee-3, Era in Buzz Lightyear of Star Command, the title character in The Bolt Who Screwed Christmas, Phineas Sharp in the Darkwing Duck episode "In Like Blunt", Miles Warren in the Spider-Man episode "The Return of Hydro-Man", Ajed Al-Gebraic in the Aladdin episode "Destiny on Fire", Lord Gargan in the Mighty Ducks episode "The Final Face Off"), dies at age 87.
- November 7: Hilary Bader, American television writer (Warner Bros. Animation), dies at age 50.
- November 8: Irv Wyner, American background artist and animator (Warner Bros. Cartoons, Walt Disney Company, Walter Lantz, Chuck Jones), dies at age 98.
- November 17: Marvin Mirisch, American film producer and brother of Walter Mirisch (The Pink Panther), dies from a heart attack at age 84.
- November 18: James Coburn, American actor (voice of Henry J. Waternoose II in Monsters, Inc.), dies at age 74.
- November 20: Nina Elias-Bamberger, American television producer (Sesame Street, Dragon Tales, creator of Big Bag and Tiny Planets), dies from a respiratory infection caused by an ovarian tumor at age 48.
- November 26: Marco Biassoni, Italian comic artist, illustrator and animator, dies at age 71 or 72.

=== December ===
- December 2: Bill "Tex" Henson, American animator (Walt Disney Company, Famous Studios, Jay Ward), dies in a traffic accident at age 78.
- December 3: Mike Svayko, American animator (American Pop, Fire and Ice, Starchaser: The Legend of Orin), storyboard artist (Disney Television Animation, Nickelodeon Animation Studio), background artist (Barbie and the Rockers: Out of This World), prop designer (The Chipmunk Adventure), technical director (Starchaser: The Legend of Orin), sheet timer (Disney Television Animation, Klasky Csupo, Charlotte's Web 2: Wilbur's Great Adventure) and director (Beetle Bailey, The Little Clowns of Happytown, Dino-Riders, Cartoon All-Stars to the Rescue, Disney Television Animation, Star Street: The Adventures of the Star Kids, Spider-Man, CatDog, ChalkZone), dies at age 48.

=== Specific date unknown ===
- Jane Conger Belson Shimané, American film director and animator (Odds & Ends), dies at age 74 or 75.
- John T. Miller, American animator and storyboard artist (Street Fighter, Fantastic Four, Invasion America, Disney Television Animation, Courage the Cowardly Dog), dies at an unknown age.

== See also ==
- 2002 in anime
