= List of The Trap Door episodes =

This is a list of all the episodes of The Trap Door. The claymation animated television series began in 1986, running for two series of 25 and 15 episodes.

All 40 episodes are now available on a single DVD released February 21, 2005.

== Series overview ==
Series	Episodes	Originally released	
Series	Episodes	First released	Last released
1	25	6 October 1986	7 November 1986
2	15	TBC	TBC

== Series 1 (1986) ==
#	Title	Original airdate	Production code
1	"Breakfast Time"	6 October 1986	
A long necked monster emerges from the Trap Door and eats the breakfast that Berk has prepared for the Thing Upstairs. A big, angry red monster chases Berk, only to be scared off by its own reflection. The yellow creature is then used as a makeshift meal for the Thing Upstairs by Berk.
2	"Slither, Wriggle and Writhe"	7 October 1986	
Berk is putting up shelves. After breaking the wood he was trying to use, he tries to take some from the Trap Door, only to be attacked by a kraken.
3	"Food for Thort"	8 October 1986	
The Thing Upstairs' carnivorous vegetable Thort has grown to a dangerous size. Whilst looking for worms to supply his master, Berk releases a swarm of stinging flies from the Trap Door; but these are consumed by Thort.
4	"Lurkings"	9 October 1986	
Berk goes fishing with a reluctant Boni, leaving the trap door open. He is followed by Rogg, a friendly ape who emerges from the Trap Door.
5	"Gourmet's Delight"	10 October 1986	
Berk makes a gourmet dinner, leaving the kitchen in a mess. An invisible thing called the Bubo emerges from the Trap Door and causes mischief, until made visible by Berk.
6	"Creepy Crawly"	13 October 1986	
A giant spider terrorizes Boni and Berk, until wrapped by Drutt in its own web and tipped through the Trap Door.
7	"The Big Thing"	14 October 1986	
Rogg takes Boni to the castle battlements to hide from Berk.
8	"Ghoulies"	15 October 1986	
Berk finds a spell book and mistakenly summons some ghoulies.
9	"The Dose"	16 October 1986	
The Thing Upstairs has a cold, so Berk makes up some medicine. A green slime emerges from the Trap Door and drinks it.
10	"The Thingy"	17 October 1986	
Berk nails the Trap Door shut, only for it to be immediately broken open by a mischievous powerful red demon that begins changing everyone's shape.
11	"Don't Let the Bed Bugs Bite"	20 October 1986	
Berk goes to sleep but something horrid emerges from the Trap Door and kidnaps Boni. Berk goes down to rescue him. This is one of two episodes revealed to be a dream at the end, the other being "Moany Boni".
12	"Fester Rancid"	21 October 1986	
The Bubo (now coloured yellow after being pelted with scunge in "Gourmet's Delight") returns, and torments Boni and Drutt, eventually running off with Boni and using him as a drum. (The title name is an obvious spoof on the then TV Star Esther Rantzen, whose name, thanks in part to Terry Wogan was open to many variations.)
13	"The Pain"	22 October 1986	
The Thing Upstairs has toothache so Berk goes to sort it out. Drutt wedges open the Trap Door so he can eat some worms, inevitably releasing a giant hungry Slug which decides to eat him instead. This episode is centered on Drutt trying to escape from the creature.
14	"The Little Thing"	23 October 1986	
A noisy little blob horn has escaped and Berk must catch it before it wakes the Thing Upstairs.
15	"Don't Open That Trap Door"	24 October 1986	
Whilst cleaning out his cupboard, Berk finds an old radio and all the monsters (past and future) emerge from the Trap Door to dance to the full version of the theme tune. This episode acts as a music video of the series.
16	"Junk Food"	27 October 1986	
Rogg returns and eats all the garbage; he then causes trouble by going up to the Thing Upstairs's room.
17	"Yechh!"	28 October 1986	
A monster lays eggs in Berk's pantry, which hatch into giant slugs, which Berk admires; but these sponteneously explode, filling the cellar with yellow slime, which Berk releases through the Trap Door.
18	"Flyin' Wotsit Fingy"	29 October 1986	
Berk is trying to take a photograph of Boni and Drutt but is interrupted by a green bat, which he and Drutt pursue around the cellar. Ultimately, Berk's camera photographs them all, and the flier escapes into his master's bedroom.
19	"Strange Goings On"	30 October 1986	
Berk is taking everyone on a picnic but has to scratch the Thing Upstairs before he leaves. While he is gone something pulls Boni down the Trap Door. This episode is centered on Boni and his experiences through the Trap Door caverns, then the swamp.
20	"Midnight Snack"	31 October 1986	
Whilst everyone is asleep, three near-identical greedy zombies raid the kitchen, causing a mess.
21	"Nasty Stuff"	3 November 1986	
Berk makes some medicine for his headache, but after drinking it, he becomes a monster.
22	"Sniff That"	4 November 1986	
Something with a lot of eyes sneaks up on Berk while he is trying to unclog a drain. An Elephant Bug that sucks things into its trunk climbs out too, and in the end solves both his problems.
23	"Vile Pile"	5 November 1986	
All the rubbish Berk keeps throwing down the Trap Door comes to life and starts spitting slime at him.
24	"Slightly Weird"	6 November 1986	
Berk tries to pick mushrooms to feed the Thing Upstairs for breakfast, until one of them runs off.
25	"Bye Bye Berk"	7 November 1986	
Fed up with his lifestyle, Berk departs, and later returns (implying that he needed a break).

== Series 2 ==
#	Title	Original airdate	Production code
1	"Scunge"		
Bubo (in his final appearance in the programme) comes up from the trap door once again and starts a scunge fight.
2	"Oh Globbits"		
After Berk bungs up a burst water pipe with a worm (though the worm works itself free), he has to get rid of a giant green flying sponge that came out of the trap door.
3	"Moany Boni"		
A blue devil comes up from the trap door and starts casting annoying spells on everyone. Boni gets a body (and starts making goat noises), Berk changes orange, then red, then grows large, and Drutt continuously changes colour (green, yellow, and blue).
4	"The Horrible Thing"		
Berk, Boni and Drutt play Hide and Seek while the Thing Upstairs is on holiday, until a horrible custardy yellow thing comes up through the trap door and interrupts.
5	"Not Very Nice"		
One of the Thing Upstairs' eyeballs falls down the trap door and Berk has to go after it.
6	"Bugs"		
Berk and Boni deal with a seemingly endless plague of bugs coming out of the trap door. In a parody of The Pied Piper of Hamelin, Berk uses a bugpipe to lead the creatures far from the castle.
7	"Yum Yum"		
Berk loses his patience with Drutt and throws him down the trap door, but he eventually decides to get him back by fishing him out. Unfortunately, Berk fishes out a red thing that looks adorable but, as Boni finds out, is actually anything but.
8	"Birthday Surprise"		
It is Boni's birthday, so Berk makes a cake for him and Rogg also joins the two for the party. Meanwhile, Drutt is hiding, planning a birthday surprise of his own; in the end, he gives birth to four babies.
9	"The Stupid Thing"		
While Berk is giving the Thing Upstairs a slime bath, Drutt mistakenly pulls up a dragon from the trap door.
10	"Boo!"		
Berk throws a large amount of rubbish down the trap door, filling it up to the top, but this summons ghosts that torment him for his years of improper waste disposal.
11	"The Lump"		
There is a rotten smell in the castle cellar and Berk investigates. He finds out that something pink and smelly came out from the trap door. Rogg comes up and tells Berk, Boni and Drutt that it is a "Lump" which proceeds to make much noise.
12	"The Splund"		
The "Splund" of the title comes out of the trap door and teases Boni and Drutt, while Berk is sewing the Thing Upstairs' pyjamas (they had split due to overeating).
13	"Nasty Beasty"		
It is the middle of winter and Berk has to mend the Thing Upstairs's heater. Rogg comes up from the trap door with a green fuzzy thing stuck to him. This is the last time that the Thing Upstairs is heard, with the following episode being the last time he is actually referred to.
14	"What a Weirdo"		
A pig worm comes up from the trap door and eats Boni, Drutt's babies, the Seal, and Drutt (in that order). Only Berk can rescue his friends and save the day.
15	"The Big Red Thing"		
The series finale. The red thing from Series 1 Episode 1 returns to cause chaos, and Rogg chases it into the swamps and seemingly loses his life in confronting the creature.
