= Terry Brain (animator) =

English animator (1955–2016)

- Born: Terence Brain; 20 April 1955; Fishponds, Bristol, England
- Died: 25 March 2016 (aged 60); Bristol, England
- Occupation: Animator
- Years active: 1984–2016

Terence Brain (20 April 1955 – 25 March 2016) was an English animator known for his work on programmes such as The Trap Door, Stoppit and Tidyup and Wallace & Gromit.

== Death ==
Brain died at his home after a two-year battle with cancer on 25 March 2016.
