= Danny Mandia =

Filipino director (1954–2024)

- Born: Danny Ledesma Mandia; August 23, 1954; Boac, Marinduque, Philippines
- Died: October 16, 2024 (aged 70); Manila, Philippines
- Occupations: Voice director; voice actor
- Years active: 1991–2024 (voice acting and dubbing direction)
- Employer: ABS-CBN Corporation
- Organization(s): VoiceWorx Workshop; Certified Voice Artist Program
- Spouse: Bea de la Paz
- Children: 2

Danny Ledesma Mandia (August 23, 1954 – October 16, 2024) was a Filipino film and television director. He is known for being the dubbing director of various television series, mostly anime.

== Early life ==
Danny Mandia was born on August 23, 1954 in Boac, Marinduque.

== Career ==
Mandia is known as the "Father of modern Filipino Dubbing" within the Philippine entertainment industry. He had a background in theatre.

He started getting involved in dubbing in 1991 after a friend from the theater industry asked him to do translation works for Ultraman and Magma Man. He would become a supervisor before transitioning to being a director.

He did directorial work for the Tagalog language dub of various media, including live-action, anime, and Western animation.

In 1992, Mandia became ABS-CBN's in-house dubbing director-translator for its main network and later the anime-dedicated network Hero. He also translated theme songs into Tagalog. He also voiced Smee in the Tagalog dub of Peter Pan: The Animated Series.

== Personal life and death ==
Mandia was married to Bea de la Paz. They had two children. Aside from theater and directing, Mandia was educated in agriculture and economics; as well as an educator who taught in De La Salle–College of Saint Benilde, Miriam College, and Trinity College.

Mandia died at the Manila Doctors Hospital on October 16, 2024, at the age of 70.

== Filmography ==
=== As dubbing director ===
==== Animation ====
Original year (Note: Original airing date of media; not the dubbed version)	Title	Notes	Source
1974	Heidi, Girl of the Alps	Localized as Heidi	
1975	Dog of Flanders		
1977–1978	Voltes V	"Celebrity edition"	
1979	Anne of Green Gables		
1984	Voltron		
1987	Tales of Little Women		
1989	Peter Pan: The Animated Series		
1991	The Twins of Destiny	Localized as Julio at Julia	
1994–1995	The Legend of Snow White	Localized as Ang Alamat ni Snow White	
1994–1995	Magic Knight Rayearth		
1994–1995	Akazukin Chacha		
1995	Zenki		
1996	B't X		
1996–1997	Remi, Nobody's Girl		
1996–1997	Saber Marionette J		
1999–2001	Digimon Adventure		
2002–2007	Kim Possible	Western animation	
2004	Ragnarok The Animation		

==== Live action ====
Original year	Title	Notes	Source
1992–2001	Bananas in Pyjamas		
2000–2006	Nonstop	Localized as Girls Marching On	
2001	Meteor Garden		
2002	Love Scar		

=== As voice actor ===
Title	Role	Dub for	Notes	Source
Peter Pan: The Animated Series	Smee	Kenichi Ogata		
