= The Trap Door =

British stop-motion animated TV series

- DVD cover with characters Boni, Berk and Drutt (left to right)
- Genre: Comedy horror; Clay animation; Stop motion
- Created by: Terry Brain; Charlie Mills
- Voices of: Willie Rushton; Nick Shipley; Terry Brain
- Country of origin: United Kingdom
- No. of series: 2
- No. of episodes: 40 (list of episodes)

Production
- Running time: 5 minutes
- Production companies: CMTB Animation; Queensgate Productions

Original release
- Network: ITV (Children's ITV)
- Release: 1986

The Trap Door is a British animated television series, originally shown in the United Kingdom in 1986. The plot revolves around the daily lives and the misadventures of a group of monsters living in a castle. These include a blue creature called Berk, a spider-like creature called Drutt, and Boni, who was a skull of unknown origin. Although the emphasis was on humour and the show was marketed as a children's programme, it drew much from horror and dark fantasy.

== Plot ==
The world of The Trap Door is solely inhabited by monsters, and almost all action takes place in the monsters' castle, especially the pantry or cellar where Berk, the central character, lives. Beneath the castle is a series of dark and mysterious caverns inhabited by all manner of "horrible things", accessible by the eponymous trap door.

The master of the castle, "The Thing Upstairs", resides in the attic of the castle and remains an unseen character throughout the entire show, shouting orders to Berk when hungry or annoyed. Berk has two companions, Boni and Drutt. In most episodes, Berk accidentally leaves the trap door open, admitting a more troublesome monster than himself; but some monsters open it from below. Though mostly hostile or mischievous, the monsters that emerge from the trap door include the amiable Rogg, and occasionally others as harmless as he.

== Production ==
The show was created by British animators Terry Brain and Charlie Mills. It was produced through their own companies, CMTB Animation and Queensgate Productions Ltd. Brain and Mills were also responsible for another animated show, Stoppit and Tidyup, a few years later in the late 1980s, and Bump the Elephant in the 1990s. Together they were referred to as "Brainbox Mills". There was a stop motion movie that was in the works that was never made called The Pudding. Brain would later go on to be an animator at Aardman Animations, where he worked on the Wallace and Gromit films, as well as Chicken Run and animated television shows, Gogs and Creature Comforts.

A total of 25 episodes of The Trap Door were broadcast in 1986, with each episode running for around four minutes. A second series followed later with a further 15 episodes of similar running time, making for a total of 40 episodes. KPTV provided the editing services for the first series. Berk, Boni, the Thing Upstairs and Rogg were voiced by Willie Rushton, an English cartoonist, satirist, comedian, actor and performer who co-founded the satirical magazine Private Eye. Nick Shipley, then proprietor of KPTV, provided the voice of Drutt, while Terry Brain voiced the other characters.

The theme song was written by Scottish songwriter Bob Heatlie, who also wrote the Shakin' Stevens hit Merry Christmas Everyone, and also one of the popular hits of the 1980s, Japanese Boy, sung by Aneka. The vocals were performed by Zygott. A 7" record of the extended theme song (as heard in the episode "Don't Open That Trap Door") was released, with a B-side featuring an instrumental song called "Ghost Chase", performed by The Ghost Chasers.

== Intro and outro ==
The introduction scene of The Trap Door was a parody of many of Vincent Price's horror film introductions:

Somewhere in the dark and nasty regions, where nobody goes, stands an ancient castle. Deep within this dank and uninviting place, lives Berk ("Allo!"), overworked servant of "the thing upstairs" ("Berk! Feed me!") But that's nothing compared to the horrors that lurk beneath the trap door, for there is always something down there, in the dark, waiting to come out....

The following lines of the theme song, thereupon commence:

Don't you open that trapdoor, you're a fool if you dare! Stay away from that trapdoor, 'cause there's something down there...

=== Outro ===
Creepy, crawly, slimy things, that stick onto your skin... Horrid beasts with tentacles, that want to pull you in... Squirmy worms, slugs and snails, that lie there in a goo... They'll wait down there forever, 'till they get their hands on you... Stay away from that trapdoor, 'Cause there's something down there...

== Regular characters ==
=== Berk ===
Berk (voiced by Willie Rushton) is an oviform blue creature who speaks with a West Country accent. He is the protagonist of the show, and steward or caretaker of the monster's castle. As such, Berk often goes about his duties with simple-minded glee, and enjoys cooking with ingredients such as mud, eyeballs, snakes, and worms. Berk is often warned not to open the trap door by his friends, or forbidden by his master, but often does so nonetheless. His usual exclamations include "Oh, Globbits!" and "Sniff that!"

=== Boni ===
Boni (voiced by Willie Rushton) is a disembodied human skull, and Berk's closest friend. Speaking with an upper-class accent, he is something of an intellectual, but has a tendency to complain or bore others. Boni dislikes to be moved from his favourite spot—an alcove in the wall near the trap door—and is often shown failing to warn Berk about the various monsters that come from it. Although serious most of the time, he is given to childish excitements on par with those of Berk.

=== Drutt ===
Drutt (voiced by Nick Shipley) is Berk's pet, resembling an oversized spider, who often causes trouble when chasing after worms and other invaders, as by passing the trap door in search thereof. Although often characterised as male, Drutt produces a litter of baby spiders in the show's second season. He is non-verbal but makes various noises.

=== The Thing Upstairs ===
The Thing Upstairs (voiced by Willie Rushton) is the impatient, cantankerous, demanding and terrifying master of the castle, who rarely leaves his penthouse room, and consequently is never seen. In most episodes, he orders Berk (in a Cockney accent) to fix things in the castle, prepare meals for him, or sometimes bathe or clean him. His appearance is never revealed, but grotesque hints are dropped:

- In the 14th episode of the programme's first series, "The Little Thing", a lightning flash illuminates a mass of spongy tentacles. In the same episode, Berk makes a comment about his three eyes.
- In a later episode ("Not Very Nice"), Berk loses one of the Thing's eyes, itself almost as big as Berk, down the trap door, whereafter he claims to have 'seen' the incident's events through the detached eye.
- In the 13th episode "The Pain", Berk asks which head contains a toothache, implying multiple heads, and the extracted tooth itself is a fang nearly two-thirds the size of Berk.
- In the episode "The Stupid Thing", it is mentioned that the Thing has three humps on his back, and later, that he possesses wings, which are never shown but can be heard beating.

== Other characters ==
=== Trap Door monsters ===
For a majority of the series, the plot of each episode will revolve around a new monster that emerges from the trapdoor. These monsters are often hostile to Berk and his friends, though others seem relatively harmless and simply act as a minor irritation.

=== The Big Red Thing ===
The Big Red Thing (voiced by Terry Brain) is a recurring monster that initially appeared in the first episode "Breakfast Time", in which it emerges from the trapdoor and pursues Berk through the castle, but ultimately flees back down the trapdoor upon viewing its own reflection. The Big Red Thing makes a later appearance in the episodes "Don't Open That Trap Door", along with the final episode of the first season "Bye Bye Berk".

Its latest appearance was the final episode of the series "The Big Red Thing", in which it attacks Rogg before exiting the castle. Berk and his colleagues watch as Rogg and The Big Red Thing battle over the horizon, where Rogg apparently dies and The Big Red Thing disappears. The monster soon reappears and roars at the group and the episode ends from here.

=== Rogg ===
Rogg (voiced by Willie Rushton) is a large creature who initially appears in the fourth episode of the first series "Lurkings". Although somewhat unintelligent, he is fairly friendly towards Berk and the other residents of the castle. In the episode "Junk Food", Berk initially dislikes him after Rogg unwittingly gets him into trouble with The Thing Upstairs, the latter mistaking Rogg for a poorly prepared dinner. When confronting the Red Thing during the final episode of the second series "The Big Red Thing", Rogg is pronounced dead as the credits roll, before revealing himself to be alive in the aftermath.

=== Bubo ===
Bubo (voiced by Terry Brain) is a recurring monster that first appears in the episode "Gourmet's Delight". In the episode, he is initially invisible until he is covered in a yellow substance. Upon catching him, Berk inflates his body through a small hole in the top of his head, before releasing him to soar back down the trapdoor. In the episode "Fester Rancid", Bubo kidnaps Boni and begins repeatedly hitting him with a stick beside a lake, before he is tossed into the water by Berk. Bubo appears for the last time in the episode "Scunge", where he returns to irritate Berk but is ultimately sent back down the trapdoor by Rogg.

=== The Splund ===
The Splund (voiced by Terry Brain) is a large, round monster capable of teleportation. It was one of the few Trap Door creatures capable of speaking, doing so in a deep, demonic-sounding tone. It appeared in the episode "Don't Open That Trap Door", often singing along to the lyrics of the theme song. In the episode "The Splund", it emerged from the Trap Door and began terrorizing Boni and Drutt by teleporting around and threatening to eat them. Berk touched it with the point of a sewing needle, causing it to burst like a balloon and reveal that despite its intimidating manner, it was full of nothing but air. Its voice was edited with a harmonizer, initially deepened when it spoke, but increasing sporadically when it began laughing.

== Broadcast history ==
In the UK, The Trap Door was originally aired during the mid-1980s on ITV in the afternoon children's programming line-up, and later went into repeats on Motormouth on Saturday mornings. Newer episodes were featured in Ghost Train, also on Saturday mornings. The show was aired again from 1996–2004 when it was broadcast by Channel 4 during early weekday mornings. It was repeated in 2004 on Nick Jr Classics, 2005 on Trouble and 2009 on POP, and it was also repeated on Channel 5. Both seasons are currently available on iTunes, ITVX and Amazon Prime Video.

It was shown in Australia throughout 1991 and from 1997 to 2000 on ABC usually airing after 5pm at 5:25 or 5:55 but has also aired in the morning on the ABC TV show Couch Potato (TV series) for a brief period in 1991.

== Merchandise ==
=== Games ===
The television series spawned a video game in the mid-80s called The Trap Door and a sequel called Through The Trap Door. These games were available for the ZX Spectrum, the Amstrad CPC and the Commodore 64.

A board game was also released, entitled Berk's Trap Door Game, which involved going around the board while trying to knock one's opponents over by launching one of four dice, each hidden beneath its own trapdoor, in the game board's central catapulting mechanism.

=== UK VHS and DVD releases ===
All 40 episodes were released over 4 VHS videotapes in the UK by Channel 5 Video in the 1980s.

| VHS Name | Catalogue Number | Release Date | Episodes |
|---|---|---|---|
| The Trap Door: Creepy Crawly; Adventures | CFV 05752 | 3 November 1986 | "Breakfast Time"; "Slither, Wriggle and Writhe"; "Food for Thort"; "Lurkings"; "Gourmet's Delight"; "Creepy Crawly"; "The Big Thing"; "Ghoulies"; "The Dose"; "The Thingy"; "Don't Let the Bed Bugs Bite"; "Fester Rancid" |
| The Trap Door: Watch Out for That Nasty Stuff | CFV 05762 | 3 November 1986 | "The Pain"; "The Little Thing"; "Don't Open that Trap Door"; "Junk Food"; "Yechh!"; "Flyin' Wotsit Fingy"; "Strange Goings On"; "Midnight Snack"; "Nasty Stuff"; "Sniff That"; "Vile Pile"; "Slightly Weird"; "Bye Bye Berk" |
| The Trap Door: Scunge | CFV 04672 | | "Scunge"; "Oh Globbits"; "Moany Boni"; "The Horrible Thing"; "Not Very Nice"; "Bugs"; "Yum Yum"; "Birthday Surprise" |
| The Trap Door: The Stupid Thing | CFV 04692 | | "The Stupid Thing"; "Boo!"; "The Lump"; "The Splund"; "Nasty Beasty"; "What a Weirdo"; "The Big Red Thing" |

In the 1990s, 36 episodes were re-released over 3 videos by Castle Vision (a distribution of Castle Communications plc). The missing four episodes from each of these videos were "Bye Bye Berk". "What a Weirdo", "Nasty Beasty" and "The Big Red Thing".

| VHS Name | Catalogue Number | Episodes |
|---|---|---|
| The Trap Door: Creepy Crawly; Adventures | CVS 4076 | "Breakfast Time"; "Slither, Wriggle and Writhe"; "Food for Thort"; "Lurkings"; "Gourmet's Delight"; "Creepy Crawly"; "The Big Thing"; "Ghoulies"; "The Dose"; "The Thingy"; "Don't Let the Bed Bugs Bite"; "Fester Rancid"; NOTE: It was re-released as "Breakfast Time and 11 Other Adventures" on 13 March 2000 (CHV 2164). |
| The Trap Door: The Stupid Thing and 11 Other Adventures | CVS 4077 | "The Stupid Thing"; "Scunge"; "Oh Globbits"; "Moany Boni"; "The Horrible Thing"; "Not Very Nice"; "Bugs"; "Yum Yum"; "Birthday Surprise"; "Boo!"; "The Lump"; "The Splund"; NOTE: It was re-released with the same title under the "Playbox" label (PVC 121), and it got re-released again with the same title on 13 March 2000 (CHV 2163). |
| The Trap Door: 12 Scary Episodes | CVS 4100 | "The Pain"; "The Little Thing"; "Don't Open That Trap Door"; "Junk Food"; "Yechh!"; "Flyin' Wotsit Fingy"; "Strange Goings On"; "Midnight Snack"; "Nasty Stuff"; "Sniff That"; "Vile Pile"; "Slightly Weird"; NOTE: It was re-released as "The Pain and 11 Other Scary Episodes" on 27 September 1999 (CHV 2076). |

A rare double video-cassette released in Canada at one point contained every single episode.

A complete series release of The Trap Door, consisting of all 40 episodes, was released on DVD by Universal Pictures Video and Right Entertainment in 2005.

=== Australian VHS releases ===
- Roadshow Entertainment (1999)

| VHS title | Release date | Episodes |
|---|---|---|
| The Trap Door – Volume 1 – Breakfast Time (101702) | 8 March 1999 | Breakfast Time, Slither Wriggle and Writhe, Lurkings, Gourmet's Delight, Creepy Crawly, The Big Thing, Ghoulies, The Dose, The Thingy, Don't Let the Bed Bugs Bite and Fester Rancid |
| The Trap Door – Volume 2 – The Stupid Thing (102137) | 14 June 1999 | Scunge, Oh Globbits, Moany Boni, The Horrible Thing, Not Very Nice, Bugs, Yum Yum, Birthday Surprise, The Stupid Thing, Boo!, The Lump, The Splund, Nasty Beasty, What a Weirdo and The Big Red Thing |
| The Trap Door – Volume 3 – The Pain (102097) | 11 October 1999 | The Pain, The Little Thing, Don't Open that Trap Door, Junk Food, Yechh!, Flying Wotsit Fingy, Strange Goings On, Midnight Snack, Nasty Stuff, Sniff That, Vile Pile, Slightly Weird and Bye Bye Berk |
