= Tamala 2010: A Punk Cat in Space =

2002 experimental science-fiction anime film

- Genre: Science fiction Avant-garde
- Anime film
- Directed by: t.o.L
- Produced by: Seiichi Tsukada, Kazuko Mio, t.o.L
- Written by: t.o.L
- Music by: t.o.L
- Studio: Kinétique
- Licensed by: US: American Cinematheque/Vitagraph (2004); Deaf Crocodile (2024)
- Released: 19 October 2002
- Runtime: 92 minutes
- Manga

Tamala in Space
- Magazine: Elle Japon
- Original run: October 2002 – present
- Original video animation

Tamala on Parade
- Directed by: t.o.L
- Written by: t.o.L
- Studio: Catty & Co. Partners
- Released: 24 August 2007
- Runtime: 35 minutes
- Anime film

Tamala 2030: A Punk Cat in Dark
- Directed by: t.o.L
- Written by: t.o.L
- Music by: t.o.L
- Released: 2026

TAMALA 2010: A Punk Cat in Space is a 2002 Japanese avant-garde animated film written, directed and featuring music by the two-person team t.o.L ("trees of Life"), known individually as K. and kuno. The film features both 2D and 3D computer animation, and is mostly black-and-white. The characters, designed by t.o.L and Kentarō Konpon, are reminiscent of Sanrio's Hello Kitty and 1960s anime and manga such as Astro Boy.

== Synopsis ==
The creators admit that one of the film's central plot points, about a cult operating as a postal service and corporate monopoly, is influenced and adapted from Thomas Pynchon's novel The Crying of Lot 49.

It begins in Meguro City, Tokyo, Cat Earth, a world of corporations and commercialism, where a giant mechanical Colonel Sanders wanders the streets with an axe embedded in its head, loudly advertising the restaurant. Tamala, bored with the city, leaves her home against the wishes of her human mother and flies away in a personal spaceship bound for her birthplace, Orion. Her ship is shot down by the Mysterious Postcat, and lands on the outskirts of Hate City on the Planet Q, a city populated by a contentious mix of cats and dogs. There she meets a male cat, Michelangelo, who becomes her boyfriend. While visiting a museum, Tamala discovers a mural detailing the sacrificial rituals of the ancient Minerva cult religion and the ruins of a statue of a female cat named Tatla. Later, the couple is pursued by Kentauros, a sadistic dog who is a motorcycle cop. Kentauros attacks and eats Tamala while Michelangelo abandons her and cowers nearby.

The film then switches focus to a future presentation given on Cat Earth by Professor Nominos, presumably an elderly Michelangelo Nominos, on the secret history of CATTY & Co. He reveals that the company is an offshoot of the Minerva religion, and that Tamala first appeared in the companies advertising in 1869 and has reappeared sporadically over the next 150 years as their mascot on packaging, print, and filmed advertisements. The presentation is interrupted by an attack, presumably by Minerva/Catty & Co. and the room is burned.

Professor Nominos appears to die in the fire but returns in an undead form, floating down Hate City's river in the film's present time. He approaches the present Michelangelo and while his body falls apart he tells him of Tamala's identity as a recurring reincarnation of Tatla whose recurring ritual sacrifice serves the goals and gives power to The Minerva Cult and its corporate and possibly imperial ambitions. As Hate City dissolves into widespread violence between dogs and cats (including the death of Kentauros) Tamala spontaneously revives under a park bench (much to the seated Michelangelo's surprise) and continues without him on her voyage to Orion, accompanied now by the mouse Penelope, a former sex slave of Kentauros. As she leaves we see through product branding, advertising, newspapers, and street conversation that Hate City is now taken over completely by CATTY & Co.

== Characters ==
- Tamala — A young female cat, born in the Orion Constellation on the Odessa star; cute, but uses much foul language. She was genetically engineered in Cat Year 1869 to always remain a year and a half old, in order to be the immortal mascot of the mega-conglomerate CATTY & Co. She is, along with Tatla, the reincarnation of the goddess Minerva, and idol of the Minerva cult. She is voiced by Hisayo Mochizuki
- Michelangelo — A young male cat who lives in Hate City on Planet Q. He becomes Tamala's boyfriend, despite being considerably more mature and cultured than she. His full name is once given as Michelangelo Nominos, which implies that he and Professor Nominos are one and the same. He is voiced by Shinji Takeda.
- Kentauros — A sadistic German Shepherd who dresses as a motorcycle cop (although he is not a police officer). Although extremely violent, he has a fetish for sailor boys and keeps a mouse, Penelope, locked in a cage for his pleasure. He is eventually killed in a cat riot.
- Professor Nominos — an elderly scholar who has been researching the history of CATTY & Co. and has uncovered the vast conspiracy involving Tamala and the Minerva Cult. When he converses with Michelangelo he implies that they may be the same person and that he, like Tamala, cannot die. Voiced by Takeshi Kato.
- Tatla — A giant cat robot that lives in another dimension in Meguro City. She is constantly ascending above the city via a huge escalator. She is revealed to be the idol of the Minerva cult, and has a deep connection to Tamala. She is the only character rendered in 3D computer graphics.
- The Mysterious Postcat — An immortal agent of CATTY & Co. He keeps tabs on Tamala and tries to prevent her from getting to Orion.
- Penelope — A mouse kept by Kentauros. She eventually escapes her cage and joins Tamala in her journey to Orion.
- Human Mother — Tamala's human foster mother. She is always depicted nude, playing video games with a giant snake wrapped around her. She is determined to not let Tamala reach Orion.

== Release ==
In the U.S., Tamala 2010 received a theatrical release in early 2004, and was reissued on Blu-ray as Deaf Crocodile's first anime license in October 2024.

== Reception ==
During its 2004 U.S. theatrical run, Kevin Thomas of the Los Angeles Times gave Tamala 2010 a mixed review. Despite finding the storyline "hard to follow", he noted that it "is consistently compelling in its sheer imaginative force and the deceptively fanciful world it has envisioned."

== Follow-up shorts and sequel ==
Tamala 2010 was originally envisioned as the first episode of a trilogy – the latter two parts were given the working titles TAMALA IN ORION (which would chronicle Tamala's search for her real mother) and TATLA (which was to explore the character of Tatla in greater depth). A colour TV series was also planned, with the working title TAMALA IN SPACE.

Two shorter works featuring Tamala were produced in later years: the t.o.L written and directed TAMALA ON PARADE and TAMALA'S "WILD PARTY" – three short stories from different writers, storyboarded and directed by Shūichi Kohara and animated by Studio 4°C. Both of these are included on the TAMALA ON PARADE DVD, released in Japan in August 2007.

In 2025, it was announced a sequel Tamala 2030: A Punk Cat in Dark is currently in the works with the North American rights being acquired by Deaf Crocodile and American animation studio Cartuna. The film was slated to be released in 2026, but has been delayed to January 22, 2027.
