= Stoppit and Tidyup =

British animation

- Title screen showing the series' logo and two main characters - Stoppit (left) and Tidyup (right)
- Created by: Charles Mills; Terry Brain
- Written by: Charles Mills; Terry Brain; Steve Box
- Directed by: Charles Mills; Terry Brain; Steve Box
- Narrated by: Terry Wogan
- Country of origin: United Kingdom
- No. of series: 1
- No. of episodes: 13

Production
- Producer: John Howson
- Editor: Robert Copeland
- Running time: 5 minutes
- Production companies: CMTB Animation; The Tidy Britain Group; Queensgate Productions

Original release
- Network: BBC One
- Release: 12 September – 5 December 1988

Stoppit and Tidyup is a British children's animated cartoon comedy television series which was produced by CMTB Animation and Queensgate Productions in 1987 and screened on BBC One with repeats on BBC Two from 12 September to 5 December 1988. Reruns continued until 30 March 1995. The episodes feature two protagonists, Stoppit and Tidyup, interacting with various other inhabitants of the mythical land of Do As You're Told. Each episode was five minutes in length, and narrated by Terry Wogan. The series was created by Charles Mills and Terry Brain (who had previously created the claymation series The Trap Door in 1986), and partly funded by The Tidy Britain Group. The third member of the team behind the show was animator Steve Box who later gained success after moving to Aardman Animations.

The introduction theme music to Stoppit and Tidyup's friends coming along the screen at the start of each episode was "Follow the Leader" by Bobby Heath, Eric Peters and Robert Hunter from the Spectrum mood library.

== Description ==
The short-running series is set in the fictitious land of "Do As You're Told", a strange and colourful place not completely separate from the human world, as one episode features a busy road and another features children playing. The land is inhabited by insects ("bugs") named after orders directed at children, grandchildren and pupils by their adult peers or authority figures (i.e. parents, grandparents, guardians and teachers) along with giant-to-them gherkins as a food source.

The series followed the exploits of the eponymous Stoppit, a red bug of fluff with arms and legs), and Tidyup, a blue-haired, necktie-wearing purple bug who is shaped like a bowling pin, in Do As You're Told. They coexist with a number of other bugs:

- Beequiet and Beehave are, as their names suggest, two bees with a mop of red hair at the top of their heads. Beequiet is the larger of the two and, unlike Beehave, has a pursed-up mouth.
- Eat Your Greens is a blue-haired, green frog-like bug.
- Comb Your Hair is a blue cow-like spider with long orange hair and a bell round his neck.
- Wash Your Face is a Wellington boot-wearing bug without arms. Beneath layers of dirt and grime, which makes him and his boots appear brown and black, he is really pink and his boots are yellow.
- Go And Play is a light green bug with shorts and trainers.
- The big bad I Said No is an angry red giant bug who has a pink dog-like pet called Not Now.
- Hurry Up is a flying bug of red and yellow scribbles.
- Calm Down is a yellow bug with pink ears, always holding a blue umbrella.
- Don't Do That is a red turtle-like or tortoise-like bug who lives in a shell.
- Go To Bed is a lethargic pink-haired white pillow-like bug.
- Sayplease and Saythankyou are two faces of a single plant-like bug.
- Clean Your Teeth is a toothpaste-styled-purple-haired orange bug with a huge mouth to show off his big teeth with.
- Take Care is a flying blue kangaroo-like bug.
- Naughties are purple bugs with yellow spots, known to cause "Naughtypox" when touched.
- Sit Downs are pink creatures with magic powers that can cure Naughtypox.

None of the characters actually speak decipherable words as such. Instead they gabble, grunt, squeak, click, make trumpet or raspberry sounds and hum whilst series narrator Terry Wogan unravels the tale for viewers. The characters' noises were provided by the show's co-creator Terry Brain but he was not credited for it.

Unlike The Trap Door, which ran for 40 episodes over two series, only a single series of 13 episodes was produced. Each episode focuses on and is named after one of the above supporting characters (save for Not Now, the pet of the series' antagonist I Said No). The storylines are notable for their random, abstract nature, and the fact that an episode will frequently end without any moral message at all. For example, in the twelfth episode, "Clean Your Teeth", it changes from summer to winter and begins to snow, and Stoppit gets left behind on his own while Tidyup and Clean Your Teeth spend the rest of the episode playing on sledges at the end, even though he loves the snow.

== Episodes ==
All thirteen episodes featuring Stoppit & Tidyup's friends were shown on BBC One and repeated on BBC Two as part of the Children's BBC strand, as it was known before 1997, on Mondays at 3:50pm.

No.	Title	Original release date
1	"Beequiet and Beehave"	12 September 1988
Tidyup loses his roof as Beehave and Beequiet drop it somewhere on the dump (where Stoppit lives) so he has to go and get it back. When he does so Stoppit does not know he is looking for the roof of his house (rather he thinks he is trying to tidy up the dump) and thinks it is really funny until he gets squashed by a teapot. When Tidyup finds his roof he has to get it back before it rains but Stoppit has filled the bridge back to his house with rubbish so when the bees return he gets the idea to hitch a lift with Beequiet (which Stoppit does not like very much). Stoppit then hitches a lift himself with Beehave which causes Beequiet to drop Tidyup off quicker than he would have liked but when Beehave drops him back off at the dump he lands right on top of his own house, trapped inside the teapot that Beehave had been carrying him in. It then starts to rain and the two bees fly home.
2	"Eat Your Greens"	19 September 1988
Tidyup is doing a spot of gardening (which Stoppit does not like much as he is jealous and wishes he has a garden as nice as his) so he steals his watering can and pours it over a weed he found growing on his dump hoping it will grow (but it does not). When Eat Your Greens bounces by he sees the weed and eats it which gives Stoppit the idea to open Tidyup's gate while he is having his afternoon nap and let Eat Your Greens into his garden. When Tidyup wakes up and sees Eat Your Greens has eaten everything including flowers and gherkins he decides to teach Stoppit a lesson by sticking a big gherkin on him and because Eat Your Greens is still hungry and thinks Stoppit looks very tasty he starts chasing him.
3	"Comb Your Hair"	26 September 1988
Stoppit and Tidyup have packed a hamper full of gherkin sandwiches (their favourites) and head to their favourite picnic spot with Comb Your Hair (whom they are hitching a ride on) but he cannot always see where he is going because his hair is so long and scruffy. On their way they pass through the Valley of the Sit Downs and come across Go And Play but after Comb Your Hair walks off the edge of a cliff Tidyup begins to wonder whether riding on him is such a good idea after all and Stoppit loses his temper so Tidyup has to give him a good bounce to calm him down. Comb Your Hair then wanders off somewhere while Tidyup is busy dreaming about the picnic spot and forgets about him but he and Stoppit eventually catch him. When they reach the picnic spot they find that it has gone because a road has been built over it and even though Stoppit and Tidyup still have their sandwiches despite not having a very good day out Comb Your Hair then eats them all.
4	"Wash Your Face"	3 October 1988
It is a rainy old day in the land of Do As You're Told (which Stoppit does not like because it keeps him from going out to play, so he is glad when it finally stops), but he always forgets that Wash Your Face comes out after it rains to jump in muddy puddles. Tidyup has also just finished washing all his neckties, but he too forgets about Wash Your Face, so after he washes all his neckties and gets them ruined by Wash Your Face twice more, he and Stoppit chase him over the bridge to Stoppit's dump, but they cannot catch him. Tidyup then gets the idea of digging a very deep hole and filling it with water to make it look like an ordinary puddle, so when Wash Your Face jumps into it, he will not be able to get back out. After this plan succeeds, Stoppit and Tidyup find an old bath on Stoppit's dump, give Wash Your Face a bath by dangling him in it by his hair as he has never had a proper bath in his life, and hang him out to dry on Tidyup's washing line.
5	"Go And Play"	10 October 1988
Go And Play decides to do something exciting, and rounds up everybody in the land (except for the bees, Don't Do That, Sayplease and Saythankyou and Take Care) for a great game of football. Tidyup decides to be the referee to make sure no-one cheats, but when he blows his whistle at Stoppit after he catches hold of the ball, he does not take any notice until all the others decide to get their ball back (and when he gets it a second time, I Said No puts a stop to it by squashing him). When Go And Play finally manages to kick the ball, Eat Your Greens eats it (which Tidyup is not very pleased about, and neither is anybody else), so the game ends with them all in a great big pile.
6	"I Said No!"	17 October 1988
It is the Day of the Great Gherkin Feast and everybody is out collecting gherkins. But I Said No and his pet Not Now decide to have a feast of their own. They come and steal the gherkins (which Tidyup is very upset about) so he and Stoppit go to the tree trunk in which I Said No and Not Now live to get them back. After I Said No scares Tidyup he falls back into the gherkins which tumble down right on top of I Said No and Not Now and trap them (so while they cannot move Stoppit and Tidyup grab as many gherkins as they can carry and run all the way back home as fast as they can go). So they got their gherkin feast after all and it was the best ever!
7	"Hurry Up"	24 October 1988
The grass in Tidyup's garden is far too long (and he does not like it like that) so when Hurry Up whizzes by, he offers to cut his grass for him. As he cuts the last little bit of grass he uncovers a strange-looking gherkin with holes in it (which turns out to be a Naughty nest). After a Naughty bounces on Tidyup's finger and when he gets Naughtypox Stoppit and Hurry Up have to race to the Valley of the Sit Downs to find a cure and by the time they get back with a Sit Down Tidyup has swollen up like a big balloon and is bouncing around his garden just like a giant Naughty. As the Sit Down begins to hum Tidyup begins to feel a bit peculiar as he feels its magic working and Stoppit thinks it is a bit of a giggle but the Sit Down continues to hum and Tidyup eventually explodes before returning to his original shape.
8	"Calm Down"	31 October 1988
It is a windy day in the land of Do As You're Told and Calm Down is being blown about all over the place because he does not have a house of his own (so he has nowhere to hide from the wind). When Stoppit sees him blow by, an old toy house lands right on top of him, and when Tidyup sees it, he gets the idea of fixing it up for Calm Down to live in. After being blown past the bees, the rock on which Go And Play lives and I Said No's tree trunk, Calm Down hits a big tree (but his troubles are far from over, as he can hear children playing nearby). He manages to hide in a tin can as the children rush by, but one of the children comes back and kicks the can, so he goes flying off into the distance (eventually landing on Stoppit and squashing him for the second time that day) before settling comfortably in his new house.
9	"Don't Do That!"	7 November 1988
Stoppit is about to go out and play when an old tin shuffles past and he thinks it is really funny (especially when the tin makes a rude noise) so he jumps on top of the tin which carries him over the bridge and up the hill towards Tidyup's house. Tidyup has been very busy making a garden table so he can sit outside to eat his gherkin sandwiches but when Stoppit comes bouncing into his garden on the tin he decides to find out what is inside it. He thinks there is something nasty making rude noises (which turns out to be the shell of Don't Do That and when Don't Do That surprises him and Stoppit by emerging from his shell he scurries up onto the roof of Tidyup's house so Tidyup climbs up and tries to get him back down again but fails). When Don't Do That jumps off Tidyup's house and scurries up a nearby gherkin he starts throwing little tree gherkins at both him and Stoppit which gives him the idea of keeping Don't Do That occupied while Stoppit is sawing away at the gherkin. Even though the plan succeeds Tidyup's table gets smashed to pieces (and despite Stoppit jumping on Don't Do That to stop him from popping out again, he does pop out again, and runs off taking Stoppit with him) but he eats his sandwiches outside by using the sawn-off gherkin as a garden table.
10	"Go To Bed"	14 November 1988
Tidyup has grown an enormous flower, but when he hears a strange noise coming from it he finds Go To Bed is fast asleep inside it (which he does not like very much at all or worse so Go To Bed has to find somewhere else to sleep). Go to Bed just can't stay awake. But he can't find anywhere to sleep without being disturbed. After getting woken back up by Wash Your Face (splashing in muddy puddles), Go And Play (playing with his toys) and Not Now (chasing Naughties away) he wanders off to Stoppit's dump (where he tries to doze off by an old television set but he leans on a button and it comes on, showing "Derek Strong and the Space Martians" which is Stoppit's favourite programme). Everyone else hears the show and comes to the dump to see it which gives Go To Bed the idea of creeping away while they are watching the television and going back to Tidyup's flower.
11	"Sayplease and Saythankyou"	21 November 1988
Tidyup has been out collecting gherkins to make a nice big gherkin pie, but he falls down a great big hole (under Stoppit's dump) where a few Naughties popped up, so Stoppit has to go for help (however, Go And Play thinks he has come to play, Wash Your Face is more interested in splashing about in muddy puddles as usual and the two Bees do not see him). While he is down the hole, he meets Sayplease and Saythankyou (a single bug albeit with two faces who is not featured in the programme's opening), who know a way out of the hole, but will not show him unless he gives them some of his gherkins. When all the gherkins have gone, Sayplease and Saythankyou show Tidyup a tunnel that will lead them back out into the open again, and they come out directly under Stoppit in a field full of gherkins, so Tidyup decides to make his friends the biggest gherkin pie they ever had.
12	"Clean Your Teeth"	28 November 1988
Stoppit and Tidyup have decided to visit Clean Your Teeth. Tidyup likes because he can do really clever things but Stoppit thinks he is just a big show-off. When Clean Your Teeth dives into his swimming pool (and causes a lilo to appear by snapping his fingers) Tidyup decides to have a swim in the pool too, but his diving into it sends all the water out of it (which Stoppit thinks is funny). Stoppit and Tidyup also make sandcastles in Clean Your Teeth's sandpit but Clean Your Teeth makes an even better one appear by snapping his fingers which annoys Stoppit. After they have had a bite to eat it starts to snow (which cheers Stoppit up) and Tidyup decides it is time to go home so he thanks Clean Your Teeth for a wonderful day. On the way back Stoppit throws a snowball at Tidyup (as Clean Your Teeth can no longer get the better of him) but Clean Your Teeth has a sledge which he runs Stoppit over with and makes one appear for Tidyup as well.
13	"Take Care"	5 December 1988
It is Birthday Day in the land of Do As You're Told, and Take Care has the job of delivering all the presents (except for the bees', Go To Bed's, Comb Your Hair's, Wash Your Face's, Hurry Up's, Don't Do That's, Eat Your Greens' and Sayplease and Saythankyou's), but he mixes them all up (Tidyup gets an old piece of junk intended for Stoppit, while Stoppit gets a new toothbrush intended for Clean Your Teeth, Clean Your Teeth gets a new collar and lead intended for I Said No and Not Now, I Said No gets a pink umbrella intended for Calm Down, Calm Down gets a jack-in-the-box intended for Go And Play, and Go And Play gets a new necktie intended for Tidyup). Tidyup decides the recipients (including himself) all have to get together and exchange presents, but after they have done so, there is still one present left over (which turns out to belong to Take Care, as he has forgotten all about his own birthday present). Take Care has been given a crash helmet, which is just what he has always wanted, but wearing it makes flying even more difficult for him due to his short wings.

== Production ==
Unlike its predecessor, Stoppit and Tidyup was cel-animated, and while a single episode of The Trap Door would take Charles Mills and Terry Brain an average of two weeks to write, build and shoot in 1984, a single episode of this series would only take them an average of ten days to write and film in 1987. After the series concluded, they mainly did commercials and title sequences.

== Media ==
A series of twelve tie-in books were published by Price Stern Sloan Ltd. when the series was first aired in 1988, with 'Sayplease and Saythankyou' being the only episode not novelised. An illustrated annual was released in 1989.

All thirteen episodes were released on VHS by BBC Video (BBCV 4207) in 1988, but this is now out of print (it also segued them together, and dubbed over Wogan's opening lines for all except the first episode with the first few seconds of the theme song).

All thirteen episodes were later rereleased on DVD by Universal Pictures Video and Right Entertainment in 2004.

== See also ==
- The Trap Door (also created by Charles Mills and Terry Brain)
