= In This Corner of the World =

Japanese manga series

- The cover of the first volume of the manga

この世界の片隅に (Kono Sekai no Katasumi ni)
- Genre: Drama; War; Slice-of-life
- Manga
- Written by: Fumiyo Kōno
- Published by: Futabasha
- English publisher: NA: Seven Seas Entertainment
- Magazine: Weekly Manga Action
- Original run: January 5, 2007 – January 6, 2009
- Volumes: 3
- Live-action television film
- Directed by: Toya Sato
- Produced by: Tomio Nishimuta; Makoto Morikawa; Yoshiyuki Watanabe
- Written by: Taeko Asano
- Music by: Takeshi Onishida
- Original network: NTV
- Released: August 5, 2011
- Runtime: 144 minutes
- Anime film

In This Corner of the World In This Corner (and Other Corners) of the World
- Directed by: Sunao Katabuchi
- Produced by: Masao Maruyama; Taro Maki
- Written by: Sunao Katabuchi; Chie Uratani
- Music by: Kotringo
- Studio: MAPPA
- Released: October 28, 2016 (Tokyo); November 12, 2016 (Japan); December 20, 2019 (extended version)
- Runtime: 129 minutes (original version); 168 minutes (extended version)
- Television drama
- Directed by: Nobuhiro Doi
- Produced by: Ayumi Sano
- Written by: Yoshikazu Okada
- Music by: Joe Hisaishi
- Original network: TBS
- Original run: July 15, 2018 – September 16, 2018
- Episodes: 9

In This Corner of the World (Japanese: この世界の片隅に, Hepburn: Kono Sekai no Katasumi ni) is a manga series written and illustrated by Fumiyo Kōno which ran from 2007 to 2009 in Weekly Manga Action. It follows the life of Suzu Urano, a young bride with her new family living on the outskirts of Kure City during the Second World War. It was adapted into a live-action television special in 2011. An anime theatrical film adaptation was released in 2016. A TV live action series was broadcast on TBS from July to September 2018.

== Plot ==
The story follows Suzu, an innocent young Japanese woman who is a talented illustrator who lives in Hiroshima and Kure, Japan, during World War II. When Suzu was 18, she worked for a small family business when an unknown young man suddenly proposed to her. The man, Shūsaku, lived in Kure as a navy civilian, remembered seeing Suzu ten years ago, with fantastic experiences. Suzu married him, moved to Kure, and joined Shūsaku's family. However, dark clouds of the war against the US were approaching and threatening the ordinary Japanese people.

Kure, a large port city, is located within one hour by local train from Hiroshima. The port is facing Seto Inland Sea and widely known as the largest military base of Imperial Japanese Navy. As Japan was losing to the U.S., living conditions in Japan were getting worse and U.S. military forces were threatening ordinary Japanese people.

In spite of the food shortage, Suzu made efforts to get over the hard conditions during the wartime and also to prepare to mitigate the bombing damage. In 1945, U.S. air raids started and heavily attacked warships and naval facilities and the city areas in Kure. Suzu was wondering if she will return to the hometown (Eba) in Hiroshima, not yet bombed, from the house of Kure. When Suzu was still in Kure, August 6, 1945, the atomic bombing horribly destroyed countless human beings and everything in Hiroshima.

Like a lot of Japanese, Suzu could not avoid inevitable tragedy, brought by the war, and the war deprived Suzu of the precious persons, and also "an irreplaceable part of her body" which is her right hand, for her dominance and reliability towards it. When the war was over nine days after the atomic bombing, the family started the new lives at the time of newborn Japan. Suzu regained the motivation to get through, for her and others, with courage and affection, in one corner of the world.

== Characters ==
- Suzu Hojo (née Urano) – Got married in her teens and moved from her hometown in Hiroshima to Shūsaku's home in Kure. An innocent and naive character, she is good at drawing. She made efforts to overcome a lot of difficulties during wartime but is later hit by tragedy.
- Shūsaku Hojo – Suzu's husband. Earnest and quiet person. A judicial officer at Military Court in Kure. He is four years older than Suzu.
- Harumi Kuromura – Around five-year-old girl. Suzu's niece. Keiko's daughter. Killed by U.S. bomb in Kure, when walking with Suzu.
- Keiko Kuromura – Shūsaku's sister and a widow. Harumi's mother. She also has a son named Hisao who was claimed by her late husband's family as the family heir. She no longer has any rights to see him.
- Tetsu Mizuhara – Suzu's friend from childhood. He had good memories of Suzu. A navy sailor of the Japanese cruiser Aoba. He is actually in love with Suzu.
- Sumi Urano – Suzu's younger sister. Later gets seriously ill because of the atomic-bomb radiation in Hiroshima.
- Entarō Hojo – Shūsaku's father. An engineer of Hiro Naval Arsenal.
- San Hojo – Shūsaku's mother. She has a leg injury which restricts her ability to assist in domestic housework. It is implied that Shūsaku married Suzu so she can care for family, but he denies it.
- Jūrō Urano – Suzu's father. He owned a family business to cultivate and trade seaweeds but later became a factory worker. Dies because of the atomic-bomb radiation in Hiroshima.
- Kiseno Urano – Suzu's mother. Missing after the atomic bomb in Hiroshima, and probably killed.
- Yōichi Urano – Suzu's elder brother. As a soldier sent to an island of the battles in the southern Pacific Ocean. Reported to be killed in action.
- Rin Shiraki – A courtesan working in the red light district of Kure. When she was younger Lin used the rooftop of Suzu's grandparents to take refuge. There she briefly met Suzu, who offered her a watermelon. Late on in her life, she meets Suzu again in the city of Kure due to Suzu getting lost on her way back to the house. They form a friendship. Unbeknownst to Suzu, Shūsaku had a relationship with Rin. She realizes this later on and it puts a strain on her relationship with Shūsaku. Suzu feels that she is inferior to Rin but she still wants Shūsaku to find out if she is okay when she hears that the area Rin lives in was bombed. Suzu finds Rin's brothel was completely destroyed and realizes she is dead.

== Media ==
=== Manga ===
The manga by Fumiyo Kōno ran from January 5, 2007, to January 6, 2009, in Futabasha's seinen Weekly Manga Action magazine and was collected into three volumes.

It was translated to English by JManga under the title To All the Corners of the World. After JManga closed, Futabasha published the manga digitally and made it available to read on BookWalker, a digital manga store and app. It was later licensed by Seven Seas Entertainment for release in North America with the original title.

=== Television special ===
The manga was adapted into a live-action television special which aired August 5, 2011, on NTV, starring Keiko Kitagawa as Suzu Urano, Keisuke Koide as Shūsaku Hōjō, Yūka as Rin Shiroki, Mokomichi Hayami as Tetsu Mizuhara, Ryo as Keiko, Saburō Shinoda as Entarō Hōjō, Yoshie Ichige as San Hōjō, and Mana Ashida as Chizuko Hōjō.

=== Anime film ===
The manga was adapted into a 2016 anime film directed by Sunao Katabuchi. An extended version of the film premiered in 2019 and become the longest theatrical animated film to date.

=== TV series ===
A nine-episode live action series aired from July 15 to September 16, 2018, at 21:00 (JST) on Sundays on TBS. Matsumoto Honoka and Miu Arai played Suzu (adult and young) and Tori Matsuzaka played Shusaku Hojo. Other members of the cast included Kyōko Kagawa, Machiko Ono, Tomorowo Taguchi, Ran Ito, Sairi Ito, Kaho Tsuchimura, and Sayu Kubota. The screenwriter was Yoshikazu Okada (Hiyokko), Nobuhiro Doi directed the series, with music by Joe Hisaishi.

=== Musical ===
A stage musical written and directed by Ikkō Ueda was announced in August 2023 for a May 2024 premiere. It opened at the Nissay Theatre in Tokyo; the production then went on a nationwide tour from June to July, with stops at Hokkaido, Yamanashi, Ibaraki, and Osaka, before closing its run in Hiroshima. Natsumi Kon and Sakurako Ohara shared the lead role of Suzu, while Naoto Kaihō and Ryota Murai played Shūsaku and Aya Hirano and Reika Sakurai played Rin. Kei Otozuki played Keiko. Music was written and composed by Japanese artist Angela Aki. The lead single from the musical, titled "Kono Sekai no Achikochi ni" was released on February 7, 2024. Performances of both casts have been recorded.

== Reception ==
The manga was a Jury Recommended Work in the 2008 Japan Media Arts Festival, and the following year, it won the Excellence Prize. A "folktale-like" tone has been noted in the work, and Kouno's humour has been praised. It was also awarded the Grand Prize of the 16th Sense of Gender Awards in 2016. The manga had over one million copies in print as of March 2018.

The TV special received a rating of 12.7. The TV series had an average rating of 9.7.
