= Mai Mai Miracle =

2009 Japanese animated film by Sunao Katabuchi

- Directed by: Sunao Katabuchi
- Written by: Sunao Katabuchi
- Story by: Maimai Shinko by Nobuko Takagi
- Produced by: Nozomu Takahashi; Takuya Ito; Takashi Watanabe; Yuichiro Saito
- Starring: Mayuko Fukuda; Nako Mizusawa; Ei Morisako; Manami Honjou
- Cinematography: Yukihiro Masumoto
- Edited by: Kashiko Kimura
- Music by: Shusei Murai Minako "mooki" Obata Theme: Kotringo
- Production company: Avex Entertainment Shochiku Madhouse Yamaguchi Broadcasting
- Distributed by: Shochiku
- Release date: November 21, 2009
- Running time: 93 minutes
- Country: Japan
- Language: Japanese
- Box office: US$75,529 (South Korea)

Mai Mai Miracle (マイマイ新子と千年の魔法, Maimai Shinko to Sen-nen no Mahō; lit. 'Mai Mai Shinko and the Millennium-Old Magic') is a Japanese animated film based on Nobuko Takagi's autobiography, Maimai Shinko. It was produced by the animation studio Madhouse, distributed by Shochiku, and directed by Sunao Katabuchi.

The film debuted at the Locarno International Film Festival in Switzerland on August 15, 2009. The movie's plot is partially based on research on Sei Shōnagon's The Pillow Book.

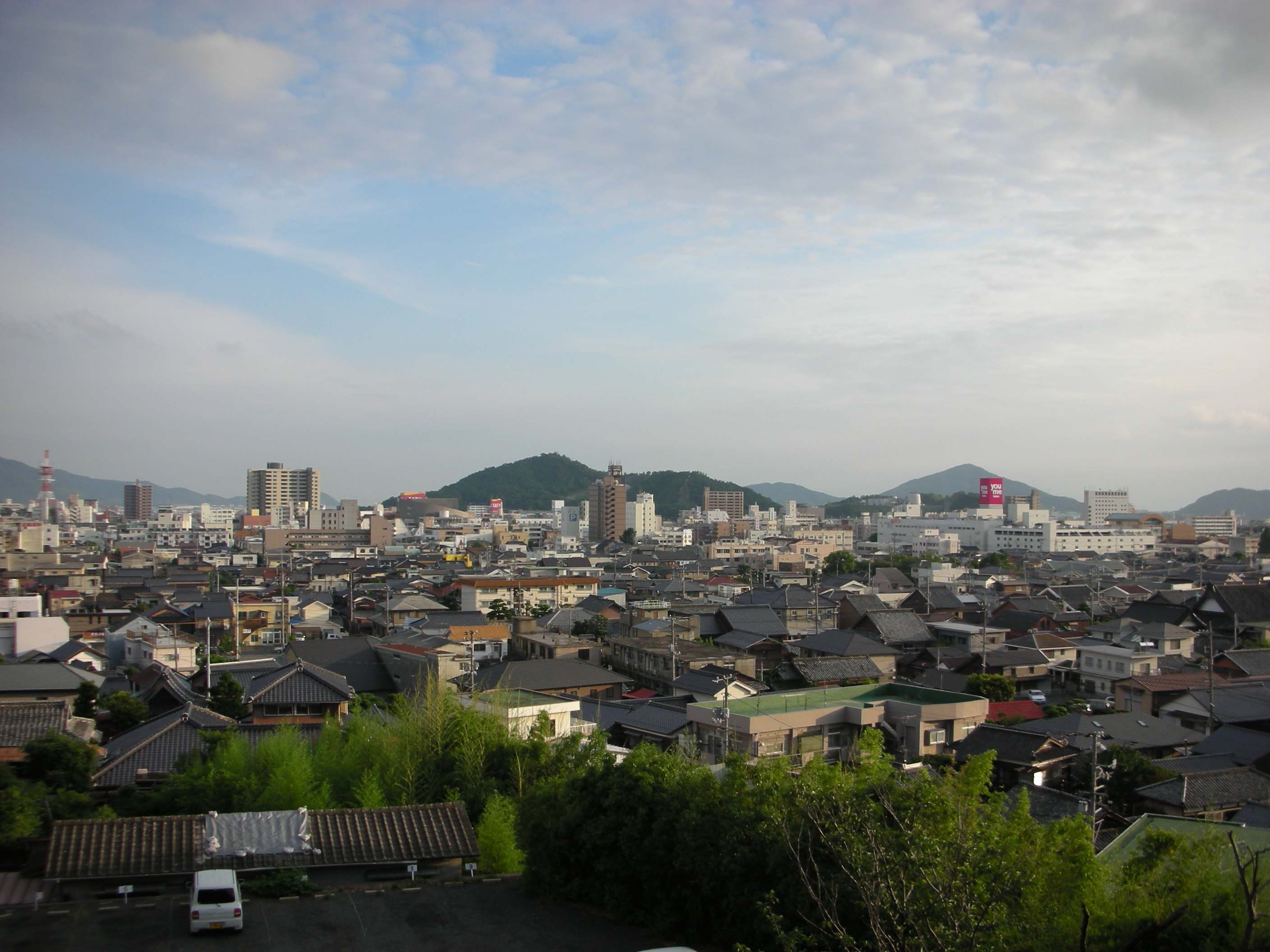
The city of Hōfu in 2006. 50 years earlier this was a small, rural town, with a main street and not much more. In the Mai Mai Miracle year of 1955, rice paddies and wheat fields dominated the countryside. But there was a recently built-up area, the "new residence" of the film, where Kiiko Shimazu lives with her father.

== Plot background ==
It's the spring of 1955 in Mitajiri (in the countryside around then small-town Hōfu) in Yamaguchi Prefecture, southwestern Japan. A nine-year-old girl named Shinko Aoki grew up hearing her grandfather's tales of life a thousand years ago, and is able to vividly see the past. Back then, a princess named Nagiko Kiyohara lived in the same village, at a time when the area was known as the province of Suō and its capital Kokuga. Shinko claims that her ability to see the past is a gift from the single cowlick on her forehead, which she calls her "mai mai". Shinko invites Kiiko Shimazu, a new student who has recently transferred to her school, with her to her vivid imaginings of the past. Despite the girls' quite different characters – Shinko is an outgoing, exuberant tomboy, while the shy and city-raised Kiiko still mourns her deceased mother – they get along surprisingly well and end up learning from each other's differences.

Along with the local village boys, Shinko and Kiiko form a group known as the Destiny Squad, whose leader is 14 year-old Tatsuyoshi. The group explores the village, including building a dam for a fish in the creek, which seemingly represents their bond and hopes for the future. At the same time, Shinko and Kiiko can "see" that Princess Nagiko is lonely and yearns for friendship.

Shinko dreams one night that the Princess Nagiko is barred from friendship with the village girls. The next morning, the fish they built the dam for is found dead in the creek. The Destiny Squad vows that tomorrow will be a better day, one in which they all laugh.

Shortly afterward, Tatsuyoshi's father, a police officer, hangs himself after gambling away a neighbor's money with a woman. Shinko and Tatsuyoshi go off late at night to find the woman and punish her, ending up in the village's dark side riddled with crime. Tatsuyoshi attempts to hit the woman, but gives up at the sight of the grief ravaged woman and breaks down when remembering his father. At the same time, Kiiko goes back in time and becomes Princess Nagiko, and is able to help a local girl and befriend her. Tatsuyoshi and Shinko return home, with Tatsuyoshi announcing that he is moving away the following day. He vows to be a good father one day, with Shinko advising him to have as much fun as he can before becoming an adult.

Shinko and Kiiko spend a bit more time imagining the past and learning about the village with Shinko's grandfather. At the end of the winter, Shinko's grandfather passes away, and Shinko moves away to the city with her family to be closer to her father's university. In the distance, Princess Nagiko and her friend sit on a stone, enjoying the friendship that Shinko and Kiiko helped them create.

== Characters ==
- Shinko Aoki (voiced by: Mayuko Fukuda (Japanese), Megan Uesugi (English))

A 3rd grade girl with a strong will, imaginative and often unafraid of standing out through odd behaviour.

- Kiiko Shimazu (voiced by: Nako Mizusawa (Japanese), Sonya Krueger (English))

Reserved 3rd grade girl and new classmate to Shinko. She moved to the area with her father (from Tokyo) and in the film starts out mourning the loss of her mother.

- Kotaro Aoki (voiced by: Keiichi Noda)

Kotaro is Shinko's grandfather. He is also a major inspiration for Shinko with his stories about life in the past.

- Nagako Aoki (voiced by: Manami Honjou)

Shinko's mother, generally clueless when it comes to dealing with Shinko's often unpredictable behaviour.

- Mitsuko Aoki (voiced by: Tamaki Matsumoto (Japanese), Halden Kerzner(English))

Shinko's little sister, she suffers at times from her older sister's careless handling of things. She has just as strong of a personality though, and likes cats.

- Tosuke Aoki (voiced by: Eiji Takemoto (Japanese), Marc Thompson(English))

Shinko's father, who works at the University of Yamaguchi.

- Nagiko Kiyohara / Sei Shōnagon (voiced by: Ei Morisako (Japanese), Katie Zieff (English))
- Motosuke Kiyohara (voiced by: Masaki Tsukada (Japanese))

== Production ==
In Lille, France in November 2007 Katabuchi showed extracts of the film without naming it. The film was announced by Madhouse at the 2008 Tokyo International Anime Fair as a new project of director Sunao Katabuchi. While Katabuchi had served as a scriptwriter Hayao Miyazaki's Sherlock Hound, as an assistant director on Kiki's Delivery Service, and had directed his own film Princess Arete in 2001 at Studio 4°C, this was his first feature film since joining Madhouse. To create the film, he assembled his crew from Madhouse's staff animators and artists, as well as associates from Studio 4 °C. Shigeto Tsuji, previously an assistant animation supervisor on Metropolis, designed the characters, while Kazutaka Ozaki and Studio 4 °C artist Chie Uratani served as animation directors. Both had previously worked on Princess Arete with Katabuchi. Shinichi Uehara, a veteran background painter at Madhouse, acted as art director.

== Release ==
Shochiku promoted the film online, aiming at international as well as domestic fans. A short English-subtitled trailer was posted on the studio's website in June. Additionally, Avex Network also promoted the film through their YouTube channel. A 31-second trailer was released on August 28, followed by a 100-second trailer on September 16.

The film debuted at the Locarno International Film Festival in Switzerland on August 15, 2009. It was released in Japan on November 21, and ultimately had a rare seven-month run at the cinemas. Following 2010, though, it ended up in the category of films receiving a box office receipt of less than 300 million ¥.

The film opened on the December 11–13 weekend in South Korea, where it debuted in 13th place and grossed the equivalent of US$61,370 on 39 screens.

Besides this, the films has had various international festival screenings, including France's Val-de-Marne/Paris (February 2010), Brussels, Belgium (February 2010), Edinburgh, UK (June 2010), San Francisco, USA (2010), Montréal, Canada (July 2010), and (during the summer of 2011) Melbourne, Australia.

In March 2012, the company All the Anime which is based in Glasgow, UK, initiated the Kickstarter project to fund the DVD and/or Blu-ray release of Mai Mai Miracle in English subtitle and/or English dub in US and UK. Initial goal was $30,000, and the project was successfully funded with $107,153.

On February 5, 2014, Anime Limited launched the Kickstarter campaign for the film on February 6, until March 7, 2014, the campaign has set a US$30,000 goal for an English-subtitled release of the film in the United States and United Kingdom. As of February 6, 2014, 11:00 a.m. ET, the campaign has raised over $33,700. On February 24, 2014, the Ask me Anything session was announced by his director, and began on February 27, 2014.

== Home media ==
The film has been released on DVD in Japan, South Korea, Hong Kong, Germany (where it is called Das Mädchen mit dem Zauberhaar), Italy (where it is called Shinko Ghiribizzo e la magia millenaria) and France. In France, Mai Mai Miracle enjoyed a release on Blu-ray Disc. The film was released by Right Stuf Inc. via its licensing and production studio Nozomi Entertainment on Blu-ray December 3, 2019.

== Reception ==
=== Themes and critical response ===
The story revolves around a 3rd grade schoolgirl, living with her parents and little sister in the countryside of 1950s Japan. Thus Mai Mai Miracle has things in common with Hayao Miyazaki's My Neighbor Totoro, enhanced by the animation of Madhouse (having collaborated on many Studio Ghibli productions). Alexandre Fontaine Rousseau of the French-language online magazine Panorama-cinéma said, "Both films chronicle childhood adventures and the "magic" that resides in this naive outlook. In the former film, nature becomes fantastic; in this film it is the story that resides beneath the surface that has a life of its own as it is so aptly represented using animation." San Francisco International Animation Festival programmer Sean Uyehara said (interviewed by Elisabeth Bartlett of Fest21.com) mentioned this film in the light of Miyazaki's oft used focus upon pre-adolescence, "that moment when kids are figuring out their personality, how they fit in socially, feelings of empathy, how to deal with anger and disappointment...They are starting to understand how they affect others and others affect them." Uyehara also pointed out one difference between Miyazaki's work (where "usually the spiritual or dream world is as real as the actual world") and that of Katabuchi (where there is more distinction between the two and "it's more about imagination than it is about mysticism").

The Variety review appreciated on the director's complex cross-cutting technique, when presenting two worlds a thousand years apart. In the film, the princess of the Heian era, "a girl their age whose face they cannot yet visualize, remains isolated in her parallel universe as Katabuchi inventively leaps timeframes." This ancient world at first only spring forward in the mind of Shinko, who believes her mai mai (the cowlick in the middle of her forehead) is the reason for her unusual ability. Both the Variety review and independent film reviewer Chris Knipp elaborated upon the fact that this "children's story" has a darker side, that is cleverly mixed in to bring a realistic perspective. "Shadowing this enchanted cross-temporal childhood ether is a half-glimpsed adult world," where the dark and complex parts of adult life opens up new discoveries for the kids in the form of "tragedy but also accommodation." And the children realise that "good and evil are not so comfortingly distinct." With this added perspective, Katabuchi's storytelling skills enable him "to layer an aura of postwar disillusionment without disturbing the pic's well-sustained innocent tone."

Shinko's opening up to the realities of life comes both as a shock and a disappointment, but it also causes her to "realize that her magic may not be real." Through the depth of this story-telling, neither "Mai Mai Miracle nor the screenplay talks down to anybody, even though the playfulness and the ability to laugh are never lost." Chris Knipp thought the most appealing and fascinating about the film was "the way it oscillates between the real and the imaginary, the upbeat and the sad, while maintaining the deceptively simple surface of childhood." On the large scale, Katabuchi's film depicts Japan of the '50s, "caught between an imperial past of rigid class distinction and its Western-influenced, caste-loose future," and it presents "two sides of an ambivalent East/West fusion, conveyed with surprising clarity." And on the personal level, we find that nothing is cast in stone forever, as real-life events affect the main characters right up to the end. Those events seem "both surprising and inevitable". In the end, we as viewers learn that life goes on, just as in the real world, which in the case of this film happens to be the booming economy of Japan, ten years after a world war and a thousand years after the Heian era.

=== Awards and nominations ===
The film was nominated for the 4th Asia Pacific Screen Award for Best Animated Feature Film. Mai Mai Miracle won the 2010 Audience Award for the Best Animated Feature for adults at Anima, the Brussels International Animation Film Festival. It won the BETV Award for Best Animated Feature at the same festival. It won the Best Animated Feature Film award in the Jury Prize categories at the Fantasia Film Festival in Montréal, Canada. It also won the Excellence Award for animation in the 14th Japan Media Arts Festival.

== See also ==
- The Pillow Book
- Heian Period
- Mono no aware
- Post-occupation Japan
- Japan, Our Homeland, From up on Poppy Hill, and Only Yesterday (other slice-of-life post-war anime)
