= In This Corner of the World (film) =

- Theatrical release poster
- Directed by: Sunao Katabuchi
- Written by: Sunao Katabuchi; Chie Uratani
- Based on: In This Corner of the World by Fumiyo Kōno
- Produced by: Masao Maruyama; Taro Maki
- Starring: Rena Nōnen; Yoshimasa Hosoya; Natsuki Inaba; Minori Omi; Daisuke Ono; Megumi Han; Shigeru Ushiyama; Mayumi Shintani; Nanase Iwai; Tengai Shibuya III
- Cinematography: Yūya Kumazawa
- Edited by: Kashiko Kimura
- Music by: Kotringo
- Production company: MAPPA
- Distributed by: Tokyo Theatres
- Release dates: October 28, 2016 (Tokyo); November 12, 2016 (Japan); December 20, 2019 (extended version)
- Running time: 129 minutes (original version); 168 minutes (extended version)
- Country: Japan
- Language: Japanese
- Budget: ¥250 million (US$2.2 million)
- Box office: ¥2.7 billion (US$24.4 million)

In This Corner of the World (この世界の片隅に, Kono Sekai no Katasumi ni) is a 2016 Japanese animated war drama film produced by MAPPA, co-written and directed by Sunao Katabuchi, featuring character designs by Hidenori Matsubara and music by Kotringo. The film is based on the manga of the same name written and illustrated by Fumiyo Kōno. It premiered in Japan on November 12, 2016. Animatsu Entertainment licensed the global distribution rights of the film in June 2016. Shout! Factory acquired the distribution rights for North America, with a U.S. theatrical release on August 11, 2017, co-released by Funimation Films. An extended version of the film, titled In This Corner (and Other Corners) of the World (この世界の（さらにいくつもの）片隅に, Kono Sekai no (Sara ni Ikutsumono) Katasumi ni), premiered on December 20, 2019. At 168 minutes long, It surpassed the extended 70mm cut of Final Yamato by five minutes and became the world's longest theatrically released animated film, later tying with Chang'an.

The film is set in the 1930s–1940s in Hiroshima and Kure in Japan, roughly ten years before and after the atomic bombing of Hiroshima, but mainly in 1944–45. In the film, nature and traditional culture in Japan are clearly described and contrasted with the cruel and irredeemable scenes brought by the war. Though it is a fictional account, the official guidebook of the film claims that the episodes and background of the story are based on facts and real incidents of the lost townscape of pre-war Hiroshima damaged by the bombing, as researched by the production staff.

== Plot ==
A young girl named Suzu lives in a seaside town called Eba (Note: Eba was a small fishing town, located in a delta area in the south of Hiroshima City. It was known for cultivation of nori (edible seaweed) and oysters. But in 1943, the fishing business almost ended because a military factory was founded on newly reclaimed land to the south of Eba. In 1945, Eba was affected by the atomic bombing and many people were killed or injured. Not all areas were burnt down and there were survivors, as it was around 3km from the center of the bombing. After the war, the factory, a civil industry factory of Mitsubishi Heavy Industries, continues to manufacture machinery and transportation equipment. The town name, Eba, remains now in Naka-ku, Hiroshima.) near Hiroshima. One day, Suzu paints a picture for her classmate Tetsu as he stares at the sea and laments the death of his brother, who drowned during his service as a sailor. In 1943, 18-year-old Suzu marries a young military clerk named Shusaku, whom she had once met as a child, and joins his family in Kure, (Note: Kure was a large port city, located within an hour by train from Hiroshima. The port faces the Seto Inland Sea and was widely known as the largest military base of Imperial Japanese Navy. After the war, Kure had been also known for the civil shipbuilding factory of IHI Corporation.) a large naval port city 15 miles away from Hiroshima. As she adjusts to her new life, the threat of the Pacific War begins to encroach on the townspeople.

Suzu and Shusaku's family house is located on a hillside overlooking the town and with a view of the Combined Fleet in the harbor. Suzu's sister-in-law Keiko and niece Harumi occasionally stay at the house. As food shortages become commonplace, the government implements food rationing. Warning and evacuation preparations against United States air raids begin. Suzu, as a housewife in a Tonarigumi, (Note: Tonarigumi was a neighborhood association offering mutual assistance that was voluntarily organized in Japanese history. This system was mandated all over Japan by the Japanese government in 1940 in order to control society more under the war regime.) takes turns overseeing food distribution, attends training against air raids, and other wartime preparations.

In December 1944, Tetsu, now a sailor in the Imperial Navy, visits Suzu. Understanding that it might be Suzu's last chance to see Tetsu alive, Shusaku leaves them alone to talk. Though he confessed his love for her, Suzu told him she loved her husband more than anything. The next spring, Shusaku is drafted by the Navy and quartered with troops in Otake City, forty miles away.

In 1945, the Americans begin air raids on the Japanese mainland; in Kure, U.S. Navy aircraft bomb the port. In addition to the death of her brother Yōichi, Suzu loses her right hand and Harumi is killed when a time-delayed bomb detonates close to them. After becoming depressed, Suzu decides to return to the safety of her hometown but her departure is delayed due to a doctor's appointment. That morning, Suzu and Keiko notice a bizarre light, followed by a sudden quake. The radio doesn't work and then the family sees a towering cloud in the direction of Hiroshima City. They soon learn that a new, devastating bomb has fallen on Hiroshima, killing countless citizens. For a while, Suzu is unable to get information about her hometown.

A few days later, in a radio address, the Emperor of Japan announces the end of the War. Suzu, having grown accustomed to the single-minded focus of keeping the family alive, is forced to accept the reality of her losses and falls into despair. American forces then arrive and occupy Kure, providing food to the local population. Suzu visits her grandmother Ito's family house in Kusatsu, (Note: Kusatsu was a small fishing town, located to the west of Hiroshima. As it was outside of the blast effects at Hiroshima City, Kusatsu and its residents were not affected by the atomic bombing. Some time after the war, Kusatsu (along with several other nearby towns) was incorporated into what is now Nishi-ku, Hiroshima. Just so it's clear, both Kusatsu, Gunma and Kusatsu, Shiga are not the aforementioned Kusatsu near Hiroshima.) a rural town to the west of Hiroshima and out of the affected area, to see her sister Sumi, the only survivor of Suzu's family. Sumi informs her of the fate of their parents: their mother had left for supplies and is presumed to have been killed instantly by the bomb's initial blast and shock wave while their father died a few months later after falling ill and succumbing to possible radiation poisoning. Sumi herself has fallen seriously ill from the radiation. Shusaku returns and reunites with Suzu. They come across an orphaned girl (Note: In the live-action drama adaptation of the manga, she is given the name Setsuko Hojo (北條 節子, Hōjō Setsuko).) and adopt her. Suzu regains her passion for life slowly, with the courage and affection of her friends and family. As the credits roll, their adopted daughter is shown growing up in the Hojo residence, sewing clothes, aided by Suzu in post-war Japan.

== Cast ==
Character	Japanese	English
Suzu Hojo (née Urano) (浦野すず → 北條すず, Urano Suzu → Hōjō Suzu)	Rena Nōnen	Laura Post; Ava Pickard (young)
Suzu is an innocent, kind-hearted girl from a seaside town called Eba in Hiroshima, who then moves to Kure after marrying Shusaku Hojo. She loves drawing and has a gift for it. She is earnest and hardworking, and she strives to overcome the difficulties of war-torn Japan against all odds.
Shusaku Hojo (北條 周作, Hōjō Shūsaku)	Yoshimasa Hosoya	Todd Haberkorn
Suzu's husband, an earnest and quiet man. He remembers meeting Suzu in December 1934, in the commercial area of Hiroshima, in a fantastic experience. He works as a judicial civilian officer at the military court in Kure. He gets drafted into the navy as a judicial soldier in 1945. Even after the end of the war, as he has to be in charge of the final legal works regarding Navy demolition in Otake City, he leaves Kure for months. When he returns from final naval services and back from Otake, he finds Suzu in the deserted area of Hiroshima. They talk about his new job and where they will live. He loves Suzu dearly and respects her artistic talent.
San Hojo (北條 サン, Hōjō San)	Mayumi Shintani	Barbara Goodson
Suzu's mother-in-law and Shusaku's mother. She has a gentle character, with a kind-hearted and compassionate nature. She is kind to Suzu, which is not the general character of mothers-in-law towards their son's wives in cultures where marriages are arranged. Often the mother-in-law and the rest of the family treated the son's wife as a servant. Suzu's mother-in-law, while in need of the extra help due to her disability, treats Suzu well and with equal respect.
Entaro Hojo (北條 円太郎, Hōjō Entarō)	Shigeru Ushiyama	Kirk Thornton
Suzu's father-in-law and Shusaku's father. He works as an engineer (Aircraft engine) for Hiro Naval Arsenal. He is a calm and composed man with a serious disposition and rarely loses his temper. Missing after the air raids attack Hiro Naval Arsenal, however later he is found in Kure Naval hospital, safe but injured.
Keiko Kuromura (黒村 径子, Kuromura Keiko)	Minori Omi	Kira Buckland
Keiko is Suzu's sister-in-law, Shusaku's older sister, Harumi's mother, and a widow. In her youth, Keiko was a fashionable lady ("Modern girl") in 1920s Japan. She marries the son of a watchmaker in Kure. When the family shop closes during the war, she is forced to give up her son (Hisao) to her late husband's parents in Shimonoseki. She acts coldly towards Suzu in the beginning. It is implied that Keiko's situation within the family of her husband after his death was that of a servant. It would not have been unusual or considered "wrong" at the time for her in-laws to have taken her son over from his mother, pushing her into the background. The pain of such treatment and her virtual separation from her own son drove her to leave her husband's family (and actual separation from her son), which was shocking to Keiko's parents, though they welcomed her back into their home without reservation. She takes her anger out on Suzu at first, treating her the way Keiko's in-laws treated Keiko, but eventually accepts Suzu as a member of the family. Later, Keiko blames Suzu for the death of her daughter. As she comes to terms with the death of her daughter compounded by the virtual loss of her son, she comes to recognize and respect her sister-in-law in her own right (as a member of the family) and not just for her contributions to the daily needs of the family (as a daughter-in-law-cum-servant).
Harumi Kuromura (黒村 晴美, Kuromura Harumi)	Natsuki Inaba	Kenna Pickard
Suzu's niece and Keiko's daughter. Harumi is a little girl aged around 6. She gets along with Suzu. She is fond of seeing warships in the sea, as her brother, Hisao, who lives in Shimonoseki, told her about the ships when living together. While walking with Suzu, she is killed in a time-delayed explosion of a US bomb near Kure Naval Arsenal.
Juro Urano (浦野 十郎, Urano Jūrō)	Tsuyoshi Koyama	Michael Sorich
Suzu's father living in a seaside town called Eba in Hiroshima. He initially owns the family business cultivating Nori, but later works at a factory following the end of his business. He dies from radiation exposure several months after entering the center of Hiroshima city to look for his missing wife immediately after the atomic bombing.
Kiseno Urano (浦野 キセノ, Urano Kiseno)	Masumi Tsuda	Melodee Spevack
Suzu's mother. She goes shopping to the center of Hiroshima city in preparation for the summer festival early morning on 6 August 1945 and goes missing after the atomic bomb falls on the central area of Hiroshima city.
Yoichi Urano (浦野 要一, Urano Yōichi)	Natsumu Omori	Tony Azzolino
Suzu's older brother. From childhood, he is selfish, ill-behaved, and often cruel. His sisters are afraid of him and he has a reputation for bullying in the town. He is drafted into the army and sent to fight in the southern Pacific Ocean. In 1944, he is reportedly killed in action. Only a single stone is sent home in place of his remains, leaving the family nothing to bury in the family grave. It is clear that his sisters while mourning his passing, will not actually miss him.
Sumi Urano (浦野 すみ, Urano Sumi)	Megumi Han	Christine Marie Cabanos
Suzu's younger sister. After Suzu's wedding, Sumi is employed as a factory worker by the Imperial Japanese Army under the National Mobilization Law of Japan. She is considered a beauty and is the subject of affection of one handsome Japanese Army officer. She survives the atomic bombing and manages to flee to her grandmother's house in Kusatsu, but falls ill from radiation exposure because she entered into the central area of Hiroshima immediately after the atomic bombing.
Ito Morita (森田イト, Morita Ito)	Hisako Kyōda	Julie Ann Taylor
Suzu's grandmother who cherishes Suzu. As a child, Suzu would cross the tidelands to visit her grandmother's house in Kusatsu, and had an enjoyable time during the summer holidays. After Suzu grows up, Ito, as a skilled and aged housewife, earnestly teaches Suzu how to sew clothes. Ito's family has a small business in Kusatsu of Nori (edible sea weed) cultivation, which Suzu also works with them. As Kusatsu is well out of the danger zone of the atomic bombing, the grandmother's family home becomes a refuge for Sumi.
Tetsu Mizuhara (水原 哲, Mizuhara Tetsu)	Daisuke Ono	Jason Palmer
Suzu's childhood friend. In his childhood, Suzu drew a picture of "Sea Waves and White Rabbits" for him, when he was very depressed by facing the death of his brother (a student at Imperial Japanese Naval Academy but he died on board a ferry sunk by the high waves). As time passes by, Tetsu grew to love Suzu. During the war, he serves aboard the Japanese cruiser Aoba as a sailor. When he gets on-shore leave from the cruise, he drops into the Hojo residence and asks for a one night stay. The cruiser is severely damaged in a U.S. air raid and settles on the shallow bottom of the harbor of Kure, but Tetsu survives. After the war, one day, he is alone standing on a quay to see the half-sunk Aoba, not noticing Suzu passing by.
Rin Shiraki (白木リン, Shiraki Rin)	Nanase Iwai	Karen Strassman
A pretty courtesan working in Kure with whom Suzu talks to after getting lost in the city. Her story was told in an artistic story board at the very end of the movie: from a very poor child given away to work at a wealthy household, until her adulthood working in the red light district of Kure. The storyboard shows that she is the 'Zashiki Warashi' at the beginning of the movie who benefited from young Suzu's kindness by receiving pieces of watermelon and Suzu's Kimono dress. In the storyboard, she is given something (a note with her name and address so she can copy it as she is illiterate) by someone. According to the manga, that someone was Shūsaku. It is hinted that Suzu may have realized who Rin was after their first encounter as adults. She was lost after the heavy air raid. The movie downplays her role as she is more prominent in the manga. The extended version of the movie shows more of her role.

== Development ==
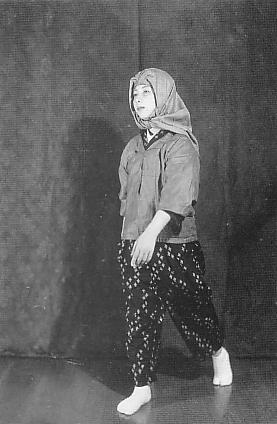
The characters wore monpe (women's trousers, pictured in 1937) in the winter of 1943 because it was very cold and tabi socks were not available.

The project was announced in August 2012 and began crowdfunding in March 2015 to raise funds. The crowdfunding was a success, with a Japanese record of 3,374 contributors and the ¥39 million raised exceeding the ¥20 million goal. Another crowdfunding, to send Katabuchi overseas for promotion, was started on November 22, 2016, and reached the goal of ¥10 million within eleven hours.

Director Sunao Katabuchi tried to add accurate details to the backgrounds of the film, such as one shot which took over 20 revisions to get right, using aerial photographs to estimate the size of a shop and interviewing over 10 elderly residents.

On July 25, 2018, the official Twitter account for the film announced that the film would receive an extended version titled In This Corner (and Other Corners) of the World (この世界の（さらにいくつもの）片隅に, Kono Sekai no (Sara ni Ikutsumono) Katsumi ni). It was originally scheduled to be released theatrically in Japan in December 2018, but it was delayed to December 20, 2019. The extended version emphasizes the relationship between Rin, Shusaku and Suzu, containing about 40 minutes of additional of footage.

== Reception ==
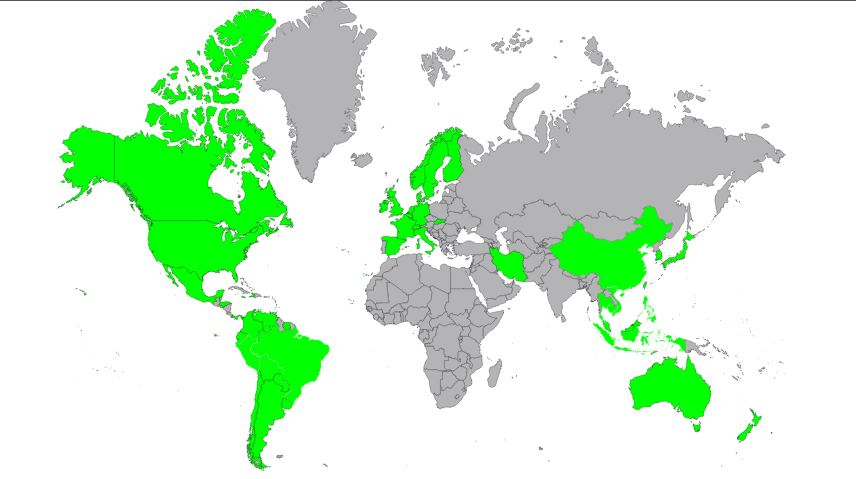
Countries in which the film has been released

=== Box office ===
The film on its opening weekend opened at #10 at the Japanese box office, debuting in 63 theaters across Japan and grossed a total of ¥47 million from 32,032 admissions. As of March 25, 2017, the film has grossed a total of over ¥2.7 billion from 1.9 million admissions.

=== Critical response ===
On the review aggregator website Rotten Tomatoes, the film holds an approval rating of 97% based on 74 reviews. The website's critical consensus reads, "In This Corner of the World offers a unique ground-level perspective on an oft-dramatized period in history, further distinguished by beautiful hand-drawn animation." On Metacritic, the film has a weighted average score of 73 out of 100 based on 21 critics, indicating "generally favorable reviews". On AlloCiné, the film has an average score of 4.3/5 based on 21 critics, ranked in ninth place among the films produced in 2016.

Sarah Ward of Screen International praised the film's visual aesthetic and screenplay as "involving and entrancing." In her review, Ward concludes: "[In This Corner of the World] is a beautiful, heart-swelling animated movie, to be certain, but it's also one that knows that such picturesque sights and pleasant sensations are only part of the equation." In a review for TheWrap, Dan Callahan found In This Corner of the World to be "beautiful but erratic", disapproving the screenplay but opining that the film "is bound to bring a smile to the face."

=== Accolades ===
In This Corner of the World won the 40th Japan Academy Film Prize for Best Animated Film, the 90th Kinema Junpo Best 10 Award for Best Japanese Film as the second-ever animated film, and the Jury Award at the 41st Annecy International Animated Film Festival, and was nominated for the 45th Annie Award for Best Animated Feature-Independent.

Sunao Katabuchi won the Award of the Minister of Education, Culture, Sports, Science and Technology in Film Category at the 67th Art Encouragement Prize, the 59th Blue Ribbon Award for Best Director as the first-ever animated film director, and the 90th Kinema Junpo Best 10 Award for Best Japanese Film Director as the first-ever animated film director.

The 65th Kikuchi Kan Prize was awarded to the team of In This Corner of the World including participants of the crowdfunding.

The 21st Online Film Critics Society Awards nominated for the Best Animated Feature category, but it lost to Coco.

List of awards and nominations
Year	Award	Category	Recipients	Result	Ref.
2016	3rd Hiroshima International Film Festival	Hiroshima Peace Film Award	In This Corner of the World	Won	
2016	41st Hochi Film Award	Best Picture	In This Corner of the World	Nominated	
2016	41st Hochi Film Award	Best Director	Sunao Katabuchi	Nominated	
2016	Selection of movies by MEXT	Special Selection	In This Corner of the World	Won	
2016	38th Yokohama Film Festival	Best Film	In This Corner of the World	Won	
2016	38th Yokohama Film Festival	Special Jury Prize	Non	Won	
2016	WOWOW Plast Best Films in 2016		In This Corner of the World	1st	
2016	Japan Film PEN Club Best 5	Best 5 Japanese Films in 2016	In This Corner of the World	2nd	
2017	31st Takasaki Film Festival	Horizont Award	Sunao Katabuchi, Non	Won	
2017	90th Kinema Junpo Best 10 Award	Best Japanese Film	In This Corner of the World	Won	
2017	90th Kinema Junpo Best 10 Award	Best Japanese Film Director	Sunao Katabuchi	Won	
2017	90th Kinema Junpo Best 10 Award	Best Japanese Film by Reader's Choice	In This Corner of the World	Won	
2017	90th Kinema Junpo Best 10 Award	Best Japanese Film Director by Reader's Choice	Sunao Katabuchi	Won	
2017	PIA Movie Life Audience Award 2016	Best 10 Films	In This Corner of the World	3rd	
2017	71st Mainichi Film Awards	Best Film	In This Corner of the World	Nominated	
2017	71st Mainichi Film Awards	Excellent Film (2nd Best Film)	In This Corner of the World	Won	
2017	71st Mainichi Film Awards	Best Animation Film	In This Corner of the World	Nominated	
2017	71st Mainichi Film Awards	Ōfuji Noburō Award	In This Corner of the World	Won	
2017	71st Mainichi Film Awards	Best Director	Sunao Katabuchi	Nominated	
2017	71st Mainichi Film Awards	Best Actress	Non	Nominated	
2017	71st Mainichi Film Awards	Best Music	Kotringo	Won	
2017	Eiga Geijutsu (Movie Art Magazine) Best & Worst 10 Award	Best 10 Japanese Films	In This Corner of the World	1st	
2017	Eiga Hi-Ho (Movie Treasure Magazine) Movie Awards 2016	Best 10 Films	In This Corner of the World	2nd	
2017	Eiga Hi-Ho (Movie Treasure Magazine) Movie Awards 2016	Hi-Ho Best Girls in 2016	Non	1st	
2017	26th Tokyo Sports Film Award	Best Film	In This Corner of the World	Won	
2017	26th Tokyo Sports Film Award	Best Actress	Non	Nominated	
2017	59th Blue Ribbon Awards	Best Film	In This Corner of the World	Nominated	
2017	59th Blue Ribbon Awards	Best Director	Sunao Katabuchi	Won	
2017	eAT 2017 in KANAZAWA	Grand Prize	Sunao Katabuchi	Won	
2017	Best 10 Cinemas in Sapporo 2016	Best 10 Japanese Films	In This Corner of the World	1st	
2017	Best 10 Cinemas in Sapporo 2016	Best Director	Sunao Katabuchi	Won	
2017	Best 10 Cinemas in Sapporo 2016	Best Animated Film	In This Corner of the World	Won	
2017	Best 10 Cinemas in Sapporo 2016	Special Award	Non	Won	
2017	Osaka Cinema Festival 2017	Best 10 Japanese Films	In This Corner of the World	1st	
2017	Osaka Cinema Festival 2017	Best Music	Kotringo	Won	
2017	21st Japan Internet Movie Awards	Best Film	In This Corner of the World	Won	
2017	21st Japan Internet Movie Awards	Best Director	Sunao Katabuchi	Won	
2017	21st Japan Internet Movie Awards	Best Animation	In This Corner of the World	Won	
2017	21st Japan Internet Movie Awards	Best Attached	In This Corner of the World	Won	
2017	21st Japan Internet Movie Awards	Best Actress	Non	Won	
2017	21st Japan Internet Movie Awards	Best Impact	Sunao Katabuchi, Non	Won	
2017	coco Award 2016	Best Movies in 2016	In This Corner of the World	2nd	
2017	National Liaison Committee of Movie Appreciation Awards 2016	Best Japanese Films	In This Corner of the World	1st	
2017	National Liaison Committee of Movie Appreciation Awards 2016	Best Director	Sunao Katabuchi	Won	
2017	National Liaison Committee of Movie Appreciation Awards 2016	Best Actress	Non	Won	
2017	40th Japan Academy Prize	Excellent Animation of the Year	In This Corner of the World	Won	
2017	40th Japan Academy Prize	Best Animation of the Year	In This Corner of the World	Won	
2017	40th Japan Academy Prize	Outstanding Achievement in Music	Kotringo	Won	
2017	67th Art Encouragement Prize by the Minister of Education, Culture, Sports, Science and Technology	Film category	Sunao Katabuchi	Won	
2017	22nd AMD Award	Excellent Contents	Taro Maki	Won	
2017	11th Seiyu Awards	Special Award	Non	Won	
2017	11th Seiyu Awards	Best Supporting Actress	Megumi Han	Won	
2017	59th Culture of Child Welfare Award	Film/Media category	Production committee of In This Corner of the World	Won	
2017	41st SIGNIS JAPAN Movie Award	Best Film	In This Corner of the World	Won	
2017	36th Fujimoto Awards	Special Prize	Masao Maruyama, Taro Maki	Won	
2017	34th Encouragement of Reconstruction of Japanese Cinema Award	Japanese Film Peace Award	In This Corner of the World	Won	
2017	The Japan Society for Animation Studies Award 2017	Special Award	Sunao Katabuchi	Won	
2017	Commendation by the Commissioner for Cultural Affairs	International Art Category	Sunao Katabuchi	Won	
2017	23rd Miyazaki Film Festival	Best Animation	In This Corner of the World	Won	
2017	16th Sense of Gender Awards	Award of "Beyond Time"	In This Corner of the World (Manga & Film)	Won	
2017	ASIAGRAPH 2017	Tsumugi Award (Creativity Award)	Sunao Katabuchi, Taro Maki	Won	
2017	65th Kikuchi Kan Prize		Team of In This Corner of the World	Won	
2017	25th KINEKO International Children's Film Festival	Grand Prize in Japanese Film Category	In This Corner of the World	Won	
2017	14th Navarra Anime Festival	Audience Award	In This Corner of the World	Won	
2017	24th Stuttgart Festival of Animated Film	Special Mention for Feature Film	In This Corner of the World	Won	
2017	19th Future Film Festival	Platinum Grand Prize	In This Corner of the World	Nominated	
2017	27th Animafest Zagreb	Best Feature Film	In This Corner of the World	Nominated	
2017	41st Annecy International Animated Film Festival	Jury Award for Feature Film	In This Corner of the World	Won	
2017	23rd Los Angeles Film Festival	World Fiction Award	In This Corner of the World	Nominated	
2017	6th Toronto Japanese Film Festival	Grand Jury Prize for Best Film	In This Corner of the World	Won	
2017	71st Edinburgh International Film Festival	Best International Feature Film	In This Corner of the World	Nominated	
2017	66th Melbourne International Film Festival	Audience Award for Feature Film	In This Corner of the World	Nominated	
2017	19th Bucheon International Animation Festival	Grand Prize for Feature Film	In This Corner of the World	Won	
2017	15th Anilogue International Animation Festival	Jury Special Mention for Feature Film	In This Corner of the World	Won	
2017	45th Annie Awards	Best Animated Feature - Independent	In This Corner of the World	Nominated	
2017	21st Online Film Critics Society Awards	Best Animated Feature	In This Corner of the World	Nominated	
2017	21st S&P Awards	Most Spiritually Literate Animated Films	In This Corner of the World	Won	
2018	17th Tokyo Anime Award (TAAF2018)	Animation of the Year - Grand Prize in Film Category	In This Corner of the World	Won	
2018	21st Japan Media Arts Festival	Grand Prize in Animation Category	In This Corner of the World	Won (Note: Tie with Lu Over the Wall.)	
2018	3rd Hawaii Film Critics Society Awards	Best Animated Film	In This Corner of the World	Won (Note: Tie with Coco.)	
2018	3rd Hawaii Film Critics Society Awards	Best Foreign Language Film	In This Corner of the World	Won	
2018	13th Japan Expo Awards	Golden Daruma for Anime (Grand Prize)	In This Corner of the World	Won	
2018	13th Japan Expo Awards	Daruma for Best Anime Film/OVA	In This Corner of the World	Won	
2018	17th Meknes International Animated Film Festival	Grand Prize for Feature Film	In This Corner of the World	Won	
2018	2nd Crunchyroll Anime Awards	Best Film	In This Corner of the World	Nominated	
