= Chie Uratani =

Japanese animator

- Born: Japan
- Occupations: Film director, Character designer, Animator, Illustrator
- Known for: Black Lagoon; Mai Mai Miracle; In This Corner of the World; Princess Arete

Chie Uratani (浦谷 千恵, Uratani Chie) is a Japanese anime director and an illustrator.

== Biography ==
Uratani was the second generation animator of Telecom Animation Film. After leaving Telecom, she has worked for the World Masterpiece Theater, Studio 4°C, Madhouse and MAPPA. She is married to a fellow director of anime Sunao Katabuchi.

== Selected works ==
=== Films ===
- Kiki's Delivery Service - key animation, 1989
- Memories (1995 film) - key animation (Magnetic Rose, Cannon Fodder), 1995
- Princess Arete (アリーテ姫, arite hime) - assistant animation director, 2001
- Tekkonkinkreet (鉄コン筋クリート, Tekkonkinkurīto) - animation director, 2006
- Mai Mai Miracle (マイマイ新子と千年の魔法, maimai shinko to sennen no mahou) - animation director, layout design, 2009
- In This Corner of the World (この世界の片隅に) - assistant director, writer, 2016

=== Television productions ===
- The Blinkins: The Bear And The Blizzard - animation director, 1986
- Tales of Little Women - key animation (episodes 3, 5, 7, 9, 12, 16, 20, 24, 28, 32, 36, 40, 44, 48), 1987
- Moomin (1990 TV series) - key animation (episodes 6, 55, 61, 67), 1991
- Tico of the Seven Seas - key animation (episodes 9, 13, 18, 24, 28, 32, 36), 1994
- Romeo's Blue Skies - key animation (episodes 1, 4, 9, 12, 16, 19, 22, 25, 28, 32, 33), 1995
- Famous Dog Lassie - key animation (episodes 3, 4, 5, 7, 9, 12, 17, 21, 25), 1996
- Black Lagoon The Second Barrage - key animation (episode 24), 2006

=== OVA ===
- Black Lagoon Roberta's Blood Trail - animation director (episodes 25, 27, 28), storyboard (episode 29), 2010
- Hijikata Toshizo: Shiro no Kiseki (土方歳三 白の軌跡) - director, character design, animation director, storyboard, 2004

=== Video games ===
- Ace Combat 04: Shattered Skies (2001) - animation director for Side-story movie

=== Commercials ===
- NHK Flowers blossom (花は咲く, Hana wa saku) PV of animation version - producer, 2013
