= Japan, Our Homeland =

- Directed by: Akio Nishizawa
- Screenplay by: Akio Nishizawa
- Story by: Akio Nishizawa
- Produced by: Masahiro Murakami; Masae Nishizawa
- Starring: Naoya Sekine; Maika Kawagushi; Subaru Kimura; Sayaka Hanamura
- Edited by: Sōji Goto
- Music by: Makoto Kuriya
- Production company: WAO World
- Release dates: 12 November 2006 (Lyon Asian Film Festival); 7 April 2007 (Japan)
- Running time: 96 minutes
- Country: Japan
- Language: Japanese

Japan, Our Homeland (ふるさと-JAPAN, Furusato Japan; officially capitalised as JAPAN, Our Homeland) is a 2006 Japanese animated film directed by Akio Nishizawa and his second long feature film effort, after his 2004 release Nitaboh, the Shamisen Master. It premiered at the 2006 Lyon Asian Film Festival, being released theatrically in 2007 in Japan. The film was produced at the animation studio WAO World.

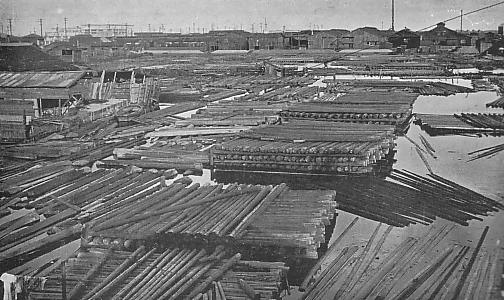
Floating timber amassed in Kiba, in the year 1933. In the 1956 of the film, part of the timber still remains.

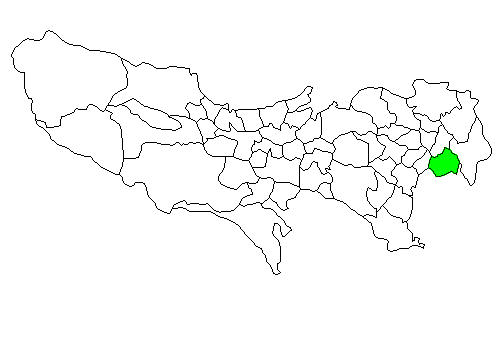
The film takes place in the eastern part of Tokyo, alongside Tokyo Bay.

== Plot with background ==
The film is based on an original story by director Nishizawa, who spent his childhood in the setting of the film. The film takes place in the Tokyo neighbourhood of Kiba, where Nishizawa (born in 1942) was a freshman in junior high school in 1956, the year in which the film takes place.

Japan, Our Homeland describes the life in a class of schoolchildren in 6th grade, in an elementary school in Kiba, downtown Tokyo. The year is 1956, some ten years after the end of the Second World War, and people struggle getting by. A telephone at home is still considered a luxury, and the teachers at school are concerned sometimes with what kind of future will await their pupils. The effects of juvenile delinquency are felt within the whole family, and people still mourn their beloved ones gone missing after the war.

In this environment, the school competes for the local choir competition, led by their own musical teacher, Ms. Sakamoto. This competition is seen as one form of bringing pride and togetherness for the school and the local community.

The film starts with a new pupil, Shizu, transferring to the school from her hometown Kobe. The film ends with her in a central position, but in another sort of way. At the end of the film, there is a public announcement about Japan finally being able to become a member of the United Nations, the announcer mentioning the word for their homeland in the international language of English – Japan. Their country is to enter a new era, hopefully one of prosperity.

== Cast ==
- Naoya Sekine (関根直也) as Akira Yanagisawa, class deputy and a bright kid. Afraid of going against the will of the group.
- Maika Kawagushi (河口舞華) as Shizu Miyanaga, transfer student from Kobe. Has studied piano and song for some time. Clever but risking to be an outsider in her new class.
- Subaru Kimura (木村昴) as Gonji "Gon" Abe, a childhood friend of Akira. Sturdily built and the leader of the gang of boys.
- Sayaka Hanamura (花村さやか) as Ms. Rieko Sakamoto, a new teacher at school. Teaching music.
- Seigo Kuwabara (桑原成語) as Yoshio Kawabata, a schoolboy, member of the boy gang.
- Tetsuya Kannami (神南哲也) as Kazuteru "Teru" Yoshimura, a schoolboy, member of the boy gang.
- Kengo Kumagai (熊谷健吾) as Hiroshi "Hakase" Sugiura, a learned schoolboy, member of the boy gang.
- Eri Osonoe (小薗江愛理) as Yayoi Tajima, a schoolgirl.
- Nana Takada (高田奈々) as Hikaru Goto, a schoolgirl.
- Kurumi Honta (本多薫実) as Kimiyo Arima, a schoolgirl.
- Yasuo Iwata (岩田安代) as Mr. Ikeno, the school president.
- Yogi Ueda (上田洋司) as Mr. Akiyama, a school teacher.
- Masaki Terasoma (てらそままさき) as Mr. Takii, a school teacher.
- Masakazu Suzuki (鈴木正和) as Masaki Sakamoto, Ms. Sakamoto's brother. Seven years her senior and a moral mentor to her. Disappeared during World War II, as an airforce pilot.
- Takaya Hashi (土師孝也) as Genji Yanagisawa, Akiras' father. Hard-working carpenter.
- Hikari Yono (よのひかり) as Fukuko Yanasigawa, Akira's mother.
- Rumi Nakamura (中村るみ) as Kazuko Yanagisawa, Akira's elder sister.
- Kanon Nagashima (永嶌花音) as Reiko Yanagisawa, Akira's younger sister.
- Ikkyu Juku (塾一久) as Shizu's father
- Keiko Sonoda (園田恵子) as Shizu's mother
- Yasuko Hatori (羽鳥靖子) as Owner of Miki stationery store
- Eri Saito (斎藤恵理) as Mrs. Aoki, Akira's neighbour.
- Sayuri Sadaoka (定岡小百合) as Mrs. Shimazu, the landlady, often lending (not always happily) her telephone to the Yanagawas.
- Yuko Kobayashi (小林優子) as Announcer at the choir competition

== Production notes ==
- 12 December 2003 – The production team meets for the first time. They try to visualise Japan in 1956 and talk about the late Yasujirō Ozu, whose films often depict this very era. Coincidentally, the centenary of the birth of Ozu is celebrated this very day.
- 7 & 20 February 2004 – Development of some of the main characters of the story.
- 20 February 2004 – Meeting with Mr. Tsutomu Aragai, slated to sing the opening theme of the film.
- End of March to July 2004 – Production of storyboards. 1,000 frames of storyboard produced, for a 90-minute long theatrical film.
- 23 & 25 July 2004 – Recording of Doyo, Japanese traditional children's song.
- 23 & 25 July 2004 – Creation of animation cels are under way. Some 30 animators are to produce 50,000 hand-drawn cels, based upon the 1,050 storyboard frames.
- April 2005 – Colour selection, deciding the colours for the characters' skin tone and clothes, as well as for the sky and other landscape colours.
- 13–15 October 2005 – The process of photographing all the hand-drawn cels. What remains is the mixing of the film with the sound of voices and the orchestra.
- 18–25 October 2005 – Recording of the music for the film.
- November 2005 – Recording of the dubbing of all the characters' voices.

== Release ==
The first public screening of the film was at the Asian Connection (Festival de Cinéma Asiatique) in November 2006. The festival was held 7–13 November in Lyon, France. Then it had already been pre-screened at the film market of the 11th Pusan International Film Festival the month before. On 7 April 2007, the film debuted as a roadshow in 10 cities across Japan.

== Home media ==
The film has been released on DVD or similarly in:

- Japan
- France (3 September 2008, as La Chorale, Kazé Éd., EAN: 3700091012988)
- Germany (by Kazé Germany)
- Italy (by ADC Group)
- Poland (15 May 2008, as Japonia – moja ojcyzna)
- Taiwan (by Mighty Media Co., Ltd)

=== Awards and nominations ===
The film won the Junior Jury Award (Prix du Jeune Public) as well as the Public Award for Best Animated Film (Prix du Public du Film d'Animation) at the 12th Festival du Film Asiatique de Lyon. The prizes were awarded at 12 November 2006.

== See also ==
- Post-occupation Japan
- My Neighbor Totoro (also depicting Japan in the 1950s)
- Mai Mai Miracle (see above)
- Only Yesterday (another slice-of-life post-war anime about coming of age)
- From up on Poppy Hill (see above)
