= Gourmet Girl Graffiti =

Japanese manga series

- First tankōbon volume cover featuring Ryō Machiko

幸腹グラフィティ (Kōfuku Gurafiti)
- Genre: Comedy; Cooking; Slice of life
- Manga
- Written by: Makoto Kawai
- Published by: Houbunsha
- Magazine: Manga Time Kirara Miracle!
- Original run: March 2012 – November 2016
- Volumes: 7
- Anime television series
- Directed by: Akiyuki Shinbo (Note: Credited as Chief Director (総監督, Sō Kantoku).); Naoyuki Tatsuwa
- Produced by: Hiroyuki Kobayashi; Shōsei Itō; Yōhei Hayashi; Masatoshi Ishizuka; Sachi Kawamoto; Yasuhiro Yamaguchi; Miku Ōshima
- Written by: Mari Okada
- Music by: Kotringo
- Studio: Shaft
- Licensed by: AUS: Madman Entertainment; NA: Sentai Filmworks
- Original network: TBS, MBS, CBC, BS-TBS
- English network: NA: Anime Network
- Original run: January 9, 2015 – March 27, 2015
- Episodes: 12
- icon

Gourmet Girl Graffiti, known in Japan as Happy Cooking Graffiti (幸腹グラフィティ, Kōfuku Gurafiti), is a four-panel comic strip manga written and illustrated by Makoto Kawai. It was serialized in Houbunsha's Manga Time Kirara Miracle! magazine between the March 2012 and November 2016 issues. A 12-episode anime television series adaptation by Shaft aired between January and March 2015.

== Plot ==
Ryō Machiko is a second-year middle school girl who has been living by herself since her grandmother died. Despite having exceptional skill in cooking, Ryō has felt her cooking hasn't been tasting good. That is, until she meets her second cousin, Kirin Morino, who comes to stay with her on the weekends to attend cram school in Tokyo and shows her the key to great tasting food: eating together with friends and family.

== Characters ==
Ryō Machiko (町子 リョウ, Machiko Ryō)
Voiced by: Rina Satō
Ryō is the protagonist of the series and is a second-year middle school student of Hariyama Middle School who lives by herself in a big apartment. Her parents live abroad due to their work, and she was brought up by her grandmother, who died a year before the story begins. Her wish is to pass the entrance examination of a high school specializing in art, and therefore she goes to an art cram school, where she gets to know Shiina. As the story progresses, she enters her desired high school, Hariyama High School, where she becomes classmates with Kirin and Shiina. Ryō is a talented cook and is capable of cooking a wide range of dishes.
Kirin Morino (森野 きりん, Morino Kirin)
Voiced by: Asuka Ōgame
Kirin is a girl who is the same age as Ryō and is her second cousin despite her short stature and looking like a twelve year old. She hopes to go to an art school in Tokyo, so she attends the same art cram school as Ryō every Sunday and stays at Ryō's house every Saturday the day before. She is shy and has a somewhat childish side, but is extremely polite and well-mannered. She is short, but contrary to her appearance, is a powerful child and is a big eater. She has an unrivaled athletic ability among the characters in the series. She is bad at housework, but somewhat knowledgeable about cooking. She later attends the same high school as Shiina and Ryō and moves into Ryō's apartment to attend school. Kirin joins the basketball club in high school and is called "Kii" by her friends and teammates. She expresses her thoughts on food dynamically. She does not like carrots. At the end of the television series, Kirin moved in Ryō's home to live with her.
Shiina (椎名)
Voiced by: Mikako Komatsu
Shiina is Ryō's friend from middle school. She is one of the students of the art prep school both Ryō and Kirin also attend and lives with an old family in the metropolitan area. She is physically fragile, but is a beautiful young lady who is cool and has mysterious atmosphere. She meets Ryō because they are in the same class together, and she knows Kirin from flower viewing in the park. She is accepted to the same high school as Ryō and Kirin. Thanks to her cooking skill, she builds up a circle of friends besides Kirin and Ryō.
Yuki Uchiki (内木 ユキ, Uchiki Yuki)
Voiced by: Yuka Iguchi
A woman who lives below Ryō in her apartment complex. Her favorite food is pizza. After her meeting with Ryo and Kirin in Yuki's home, Yuki attended the high school where Ryo, Kirin, Hina, Mei would later attend.
Akira Machiko (町子 明, Machiko Akira)
Voiced by: Ai Nonaka
Ryō's aunt. Always business at work, she rarely visits Ryo. During breaks from work, she is frequently seen drinking beer.
Tsuyuko (露子)
Voiced by: Yu Kobayashi
Shiina's maid and housekeeper who dresses like a shrine maiden. She was mistaken by Kirin as Shiina's mother after she gave her a tomato. She is the only character in the series who doesn't talk much.
Hina Yamazaki (山崎 陽菜, Yamazaki Hina)
Voiced by: Haruka Chisuga
A classmate of Ryo and Kirin from prep school, and from the same middle school as Ryo. She has shoulder length blonde hair. After middle school graduation, she went to same high school as Ryo.
Mei Tsuchida (土田 芽生, Tsuchida Mei)
Voiced by: Juri Nagatsuma
A classmate of Ryo and Kirin from prep school, and from the same middle school as Ryo. She has dark brown hair and wears a white headband. After middle school graduation, she went to same high school as Ryo.
Misaki Kometani (米谷 美咲, Kometani Misaki)
Voiced by: Asuka Nishi
Another classmate of Ryo and Kirin from cram school. She has a spoiled and annoying personality and has silver white hair worn in a ponytail.
Ryō's Grandmother/Grandma (リョウの祖母/おばあちゃん, Ryō no Sobo/Obaachan)
Voiced by: Tamie Kubota
Ryō's grandmother who died a year prior to the start of the story. She is the one who taught Ryō all about cooking, although it is later revealed she was once terrible at cooking and only started taking it seriously for Ryō's sake.
Watanabe (渡辺)
Voiced by: Akeno Watanabe
A librarian who is an old friend of Ryō and her grandmother. She also introduced Ryo's grandma to certain cookbooks when she needed to learn cooking, and the same cookbooks were introduced to Ryō when Ryō lived alone.
Tatsuki (樹)
Voiced by: Asuka Nishi
A short brown-haired girl from the same middle school as Mei, Hina, Ryō.
Shiina's Mother (椎名さんの母親, Shiina-san no okasan)
Voiced by: Miyu Matsuki
A sweet childish young woman. Because of her young appearance she strongly resembles a teenager.
Rin Morino/Kirin's Mother (森野 凛/森野の母)
Voiced by: Ryō Hirohashi
Kirin's strict and temperamental mother and Ryo's aunt. She is bossy to both her daughter and husband and often argues a lot with Kirin, but does care about her as a parent.
Mr. Morino/Kirin's Father (氏 森野/森野の父)
Voiced by: Kentaro Tone
Kirin's calm and loving father. He has an eccentric personality.
Midori Machiko (町子 緑)
Voiced by: Mamiko Noto
Ryo's mother. She works overseas with Ryo's father for an unknown secret job, but occasionally mails Japan-made food to Ryo. In the television series, she is only seen in Ryo's dream sequence.

== Media ==
=== Manga ===
The original four-panel comic strip manga, written and illustrated by Makoto Kawai, was serialized in Houbunsha's Manga Time Kirara Miracle! magazine between the March 2012 and November 2016 issues. Houbunsha published seven tankōbon volumes from January 26, 2013, to September 27, 2016.

=== Anime ===
A 12-episode anime television series adaptation, produced by Shaft, directed by Naoyuki Tatsuwa, and chief directed by Akiyuki Shinbo aired in Japan between January 9 and March 27, 2015 and was simulcast by Crunchyroll. The screenplay is by Mari Okada and the music was composed by Kotringo. Kazuya Shiotsuki (Shaft) designed the characters for animation, and served as chief animation director alongside Shinya Nishizawa and Takumi Yokota. Three episodes were outsourced: episode 4 to Mouse; episode 7 to Jumondou; and episode 11 to Drop. (Note: Outsourcing studios credited as Production Assistance (制作協力) on their respective episodes.) The opening theme is "Shiawase ni Tsuite Watashi ga Shitteiru Itsutsu no Hōhō" (幸せについて私が知っている5つの方法, The Five Methods of Obtaining Happiness That I'm Aware Of) by Maaya Sakamoto, and the ending theme is "Egao ni Naru" (笑顔になる, Become a Smile) by Rina Satō and Asuka Ōgame. Sentai Filmworks licensed the anime in North America.

No.	Title	Directed by (Note: Information is taken from the ending credits of each episode.)	Storyboarded by	Original release date
1	"Toasty and Crispy"; Transliteration: "Hokahoka, Juwa." (Japanese: ほかほか、じゅわっ。)	Yukihiro Miyamoto	Shinsaku Sasaki	January 9, 2015
Ryō Machiko is a girl who has been struggling to make her cooking taste good ever since her grandmother died a year ago. Her second cousin, Kirin Morino, has run away from home and comes to stay with her in Tokyo to study at a cram school following an argument with her mother. To Ryō's surprise, Kirin enjoys her nabe, with Ryō discovering it tastes good herself. The next day, after Kirin comes down with a fever following her first class, Ryō makes her some kitsune udon and inarizushi, reminding her of when her grandmother looked after her. That night, Kirin theorises that the reason Ryō hasn't been enjoying her cooking is because she's been eating alone, deciding to become more like a family member to her. The next day, Kirin returns home to make up with her mother, with Ryō looking forward to next week when they can eat together again.
2	"Fluffy and Crunchy"; Transliteration: "Funwari, Gogagaga." (Japanese: ふんわり、ゴガガガッ。)	Kōsuke Hirota	Nobuhiro Sugiyama	January 16, 2015
As spring arrives, Ryō invites Kirin for a cherry blossom viewing party, along with her aunt, Akira. While visiting the local food fair, Ryō and Kirin come across Ryō's schoolmate Shiina, with Kirin being a little jealous over her being so close to Ryō. After having their bento lunches and parting ways with Akira, Ryō invites Kirin to sketch the trees and makes her some tamagoyaki, expressing her joy that she could learn more about her.
3	"Rich and Crispy"; Transliteration: "Shokushoku, Toro." (Japanese: ショクショク、トロッ。)	Naoyuki Tatsuwa	Yuki Yase	January 23, 2015
Ryō's appetite leads her to make a mistake in her practical art exam, leaving her worried about what to tell her parents. Wanting to cheer Ryō up, Kirin invites Shiina over for a bamboo shoot and rice dinner. The next day, inspired by one of their favorite shows, the girls decide to make various types of omurice, culminating in a legendary soft-cooked omurice.
4	"Moist and Crispy"; Transliteration: "Jinwari, Bariri." (Japanese: じんわり、バリリッ。)	Hajime Ootani	Takashi Kawabata	January 30, 2015
Ryō becomes depressed when she learns classes are being cancelled next weekend due to a teacher training day. With Kirin having obligations with her family and Shiina sick from the rain, Ryō ends up spending her next Saturday alone, once again finding her food tasting bland without anyone to share it with. Whilst visiting the library to take her mind off things, she comes across her old friend Watanabe, who shows her all of the beginner cookbooks her grandmother used to borrow. Surprised to hear that her grandmother was once a terrible cook, Ryō learns that she only became serious about cooking for her, adjusting some of the book's recipes to suit her tastes. Upon getting hungry, Ryō nostalgically checks out the nearby convenience store, picking out the same things she used to as a child, her thoughts of her grandmother making them taste delicious. Learning another key to good food is thinking about the person you love, Ryō makes preparations for Kirin's next visit.
5	"Slurping and Gulping"; Transliteration: "Jururun, Gokun." (Japanese: ぢゅるるんっ、ごくん。)	Midori Yoshizawa	Hiroko Kazui	February 6, 2015
With everyone stuck doing summer lessons during the summer break, Shiina invites Ryo and Kirin over to her place to do some summer activities that they wouldn't be able to do otherwise. Upon arriving at Shiina's extravagant home, Kirin receives a tomato from someone she assumes is Shiina's mother, only to find her actual mother is someone completely different. Later, as the girls go searching for bamboo for a sōmen slide, they discover the woman from before is actually Shiina's household maid, Tsuyuko. While Shiina's mother prepares the slide, Tsuyuko helps Ryo and Kirin prepare the noodles and sauce. Later, Shiina's mother reveals she was the one who asked Shiina to invite Ryo and Kirin over, thanking them for being her friend. Afterwards, they have an overdue Tanabata festival and fireworks, crossing off pretty much every summer activity they had in mind.
6	"Hot and Springy"; Transliteration: "Atsuatsu, Mochi Mochi." (Japanese: あつあつ、もちもち。)	Kazuki Ōhashi	Toshiyuki Fujisawa	February 13, 2015
Facing summer fatigue from the heat, Ryō and Kirin decide to make broiled eel to build stamina. After discovering their air conditioner is broken, the girls have a bath together to wash off their sweat, during which they decide to eat some ice cream. Still feeling something is missing, Kirin finds what she has been craving is the rather unseasonal red bean soup, which Ryō decides she wants herself, only to end up with a stomachache from eating too many mismatched foods.
7	"Sizzling and Popping"; Transliteration: "Jū, Pushī." (Japanese: ジュー、プシーッ。)	Kōsuke Hirota	Tetsuya Wakano	February 20, 2015
Shiina invites Ryō and Kirin to her place for some charcoal grilled saury, with Shiina insisting that Kirin help her and Tsuyuko with the cooking instead of Ryō. While making preparations, Kirin tells Shiina that she believes Ryō has been feeling down following Obon as it reminded her of her grandmother. On the day of the grill party, Tsuyuko stresses to Ryō the importance of relying on others, asking her not to interfere with Kirin and Shiina even when they run into trouble. After using Tsuyuko's advice to successfully grill some fish, Kirin and Shiina give them to Ryō as thanks for everything she has cooked for them, becoming glad to find she enjoys them. As Tsuyuko decides to help Kirin and Shiina build their skills, she asks that Ryō learn to rely on them some more. However, when the pair get into trouble while washing the dishes, Ryō simply can't hold herself back anymore and helps out. Afterwards, Ryō finds that there's even more fun to be had when you cook something together with someone you love.
8	"Flaky and Toasty"; Transliteration: "Hokuhoku, Hapu." (Japanese: ほくほく、はぷっ。)	Tatsuma Minamikawa	Akitoshi Yokoyama	February 27, 2015
Kirin starts training Ryō for her school's upcoming sports meet, which she isn't very good at. Learning she has to bring her own lunch to the meet, Ryō feels that she should make her own lunch as she doesn't want to rely on Kirin too much. However, Kirin finds a discarded wishlist that Ryō had written and asks her father about how to make it. Though Ryō eventually catches onto her plan, Kirin insists that she make it without Ryō's interference. On the day of the meet, Ryō shares the lunch Kirin made with her friends, with Ryō finding it incredibly delicious while her friends just think it tastes ordinary. Kirin, who had tried the lunch herself, feels downhearted that she wasn't able to live up to expectations, but Ryō tells her it was delicious, especially thanking her for adding her grandmother's lemon sweet potatoes that wasn't originally on her list.
9	"Simmering and Steamy"; Transliteration: "Gutsugutsu, Heha..." (Japanese: グツグツ、へは……。)	Yukihiro Miyamoto	Mie Ooishi	March 6, 2015
Ryō makes preparations for Kirin visiting her on New Year's Eve, deciding to make oden after running into Shiina, having trouble keeping herself from sneaking a bite. Meanwhile, Kirin, underestimating how busy trains get on New Year's, forgets to reserve a ticket and ends up missing her usual train and running late. After Kirin finally arrives, the pair see the new year in together with a meal of oden and soba. Afterwards, the girls, joined by Akira, go to the shrine to ring the New Year's bell and try some amazake, before returning home to reflect on their meeting a year ago.
10	"Crispy and Chewy"; Transliteration: "Hamohamo, Michichi." (Japanese: はもはも、みちちっ。)	Midori Yoshizawa	Masahiro Sekino	March 13, 2015
While Kirin nervous about whether she would be able to make friends in high school, she and Ryō overhear similar worries from Yuki Uchiki, a nervous college graduate who lives in the apartment below Ryō's. After Kirin accidentally lands in front of her window, she and Ryō come over to Yuki's apartment to apologise, hearing about her own struggles with making friends. They invite her back to Ryō's apartment to eat some pizza that Yuki ordered and decided to share with everyone, which Yuki finds tastes even better when eaten with others. After managing to make friends with both Ryō and Kirin, Yuki feels more confident about starting her new life as a teacher.
11	"Crisp and Slippery / Crusty and Juicy-Smooth"; Transliteration: "Jakijaki, Zururu. / Shaku, Teritsuya~." (Japanese: ジャキジャキ、ずるるっ。 / シャクッ、テリツヤ～。)	Hajime Ootani	Yuki Yase	March 20, 2015
Ryō receives another package from her parents containing a large supply of instant ramen to help her study for her exams. As Kirin prepares the ramen for her, she comes to learn how much Ryō misses her mother. Inspecting the package further, Kirin finds a top secret letter addressed to her, thanking her for being there for Ryō. Later, as exams draw closer, Shiina reveals she has already been accepted into the high school Ryō and Kirin are applying to. Hounded with pleas to give them encouragement for their own exams, Shiina shares some katsu sandwiches Tsuyuko made to encourage her without her realising it. On the day of the exams, Shiina gives Ryō and Kirin some katsu sandwiches she made herself after learning the recipe from Tsuyuko.
12	"Marinated and Hearty"; Transliteration: "Shimishimi, Mugyu." (Japanese: しみしみ、むぎゅっ。)	Kazuki Ōhashi	Hiroko Kazui	March 27, 2015
Both Ryō and Kirin pass their entrance exams, with Kirin set to move in with Ryō. Kirin shows up for Ryō's graduation ceremony, where she meets some of Ryō's friends who'll be attending high school with them. Afterwards, while Kirin goes off to pick up something she forgot, Akira comes over to give Ryō an apron sewn by her grandmother as a graduation present. Using this apron, Ryō decides to make her grandmother's speciality dish to celebrate her graduation, once again finding Kirin is the secret ingredient to make it taste wonderful. The next day, Ryō is surprised to hear that Kirin is moving in with her, having been the only one who wasn't informed about it, but is still happy to be able to live with Kirin. Shiina, Akira, and Kirin's parents all come to help Kirin with her move, sharing a meal of Shiina's shrimp katsu sandwiches and Kirin's mother's vegetable stir fry, while Ryō looks forward to making even more memories with Kirin.

=== Video game ===
Characters from the series appear alongside other Manga Time Kirara characters in the mobile RPG, Kirara Fantasia in 2020.
