= Nobuko Takagi =

Japanese writer

- 高樹 のぶ子
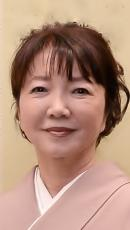
- Born: 鶴田 信子; April 9, 1946 (age 80); Yamaguchi Prefecture, Japan
- Education: Tokyo Woman's Christian University
- Occupation: Writer
- Writing career
- Genre: Fiction
- Notable works: Hikari idaku tomo yo; Tōkō no ki
- Notable awards: Akutagawa Prize; Tanizaki Prize; Person of Cultural Merit

Nobuko Takagi (高樹 のぶ子, Takagi Nobuko; born April 9, 1946) is the professional name of Nobuko Tsuruta (鶴田 信子, Tsuruta Nobuko), a Japanese author. She has won the Akutagawa Prize and the Tanizaki Prize, she has been named a Person of Cultural Merit, and her work has been adapted for film.

== Biography ==
Takagi was born Nobuko Tsuruta in Yamaguchi Prefecture on April 9, 1946. She graduated from the Junior College of Tokyo Women's University, after which she worked at a publishing company for two years, married her first husband in 1971, and had a son. Takagi moved to Fukuoka in 1974, divorced her first husband in 1978 and married her second husband, a lawyer, in 1980.

Takagi started writing love stories and made her fiction debut in 1980 with Sono hosoki michi (That Narrow Road). It was nominated for the Akutagawa Prize, as were her subsequent stories Tôsugiru tomo (A Distant Friend, 1981), Oikaze (A Following Wind, 1982), and Hikari idaku tomo yo (光抱く友よ, To a Friend Embracing the Light). Hikari idaku tomo yo, a story about the emotional lives of two high school girls, won the 90th Akutagawa Prize.

Subsequent works continued to explore themes of romantic love in many forms, including innocent love, married love, extramarital affairs, and love triangles. Her 1994 novel Tsuta moe (蔦燃) won the inaugural Shimase Award for Love Stories. Other examples include the 1993 novel Hyōen (氷炎), about two former lovers reunited when their daughters from their current marriages become injured in the same car accident, the 1999 novel Tōkō no ki (透光の樹, Translucent Tree), which won the 35th Tanizaki Prize and was later translated into English by Deborah Stuhr Iwabuchi, and the 2000 novel Hyakunen no yogen (百年の預言), about two lovers who find piece of music containing a hidden code that will help Romania achieve political freedom. In 2004 Takagi published Maimai Shinko (マイマイ新子), a novelized version of her autobiography that was later adapted into the 2009 movie Mai Mai Miracle starring Mayuko Fukuda. In 2011 her story Tomosui (トモスイ) won the 36th Kawabata Yasunari Literature Prize.

In 2008 Takagi was a Special Guest Professor at Kyushu University. In 2018 she was named a Person of Cultural Merit. Takagi is an Akutagawa Prize selection committee member. She continues to live in Fukuoka.

== Recognition ==
- 1984 90th Akutagawa Prize (1983下) for Hikari idaku tomo yo (光抱く友よ, To a Friend Embracing the Light)
- 1994 Shimase Literary Prize for Love Stories for Tsuta moe (蔦燃)
- 1999 35th Tanizaki Prize for Tōkō no ki (透光の樹, Translucent Tree)
- 2011 36th Kawabata Yasunari Literature Prize
- 2018 Person of Cultural Merit

== Bibliography ==
=== Selected works in Japanese ===
- Hikari idaku tomo yo (光抱く友よ, To a Friend Embracing the Light), Shinchosha, 1984, ISBN 9784103516019
- Tsuta moe (蔦燃), Kodansha, 1994, ISBN 9784062067126
- Tōkō no ki (透光の樹, Translucent Tree), Bungeishunjū, 1999, ISBN 9784163182704
- Maimai Shinko (マイマイ新子), Magajin Hausu, 2004, ISBN 9784838715312
- Tomosui (トモスイ), Shinchosha, 2011, ISBN 9784103516088

=== Selected works in English ===
- Takagi, Nobuko (June 2003). "Will O' Wisp (Onibi)". Skyward (JAL inflight magazine).
- Takagi, Nobuko (2008). Translucent Tree. Translated by Stuhr Iwabuchi, Deborah. Vertical. ISBN 9781934287149.
