= Kotringo =

Kotringo (コトリンゴ)
- Born: Rieko Miyoshi; 17 July 1978 (age 48); Osaka, Japan
- Genres: J-pop
- Occupations: Musician, singer-songwriter
- Instruments: Vocals, piano
- Years active: 2000–present
- Label: avex trax/commmons koniwa
- Formerly of: KIRINJI
- Website: kotringo.net

Rieko Miyoshi (三吉里絵子; Miyoshi Rieko; born 17 July 1978), better known by her stage name Kotringo (コトリンゴ), is a Japanese J-pop singer-songwriter and pianist. In 2005, she sent in a demo tape to Ryuichi Sakamoto's "Radio Sakamoto" Audition Corner and caught Sakamoto's interest. She released her first single in November 2006.

== Biography ==
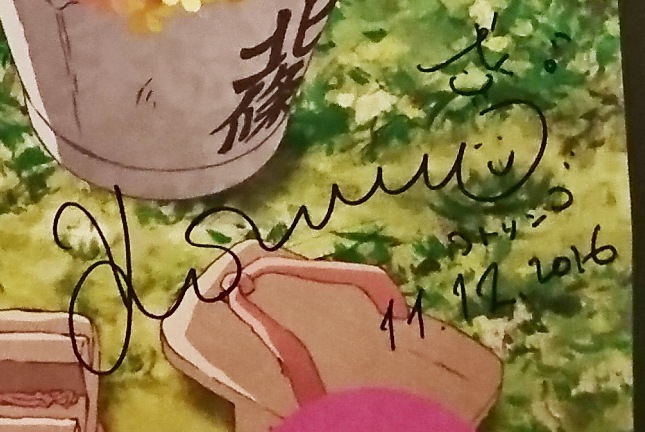
Kotringo's signature

=== Early years ===
Kotringo was born in Osaka. She later moved west to Fukuoka, and then back east to Nagoya after she finished her fifth year of elementary school. Kotringo started playing the piano at age five, and began composing music at age seven. The first song she wrote was named "A Kitten's Nap" (子猫のひるね; Koneko no Hiru Ne).

=== Musical education ===
After graduating from high school, Kotringo entered the Koyo Music School in Kobe. In 1999, she was accepted by the Berklee College of Music, where she majored in Jazz Composition and Performance.

At Berklee, Kotringo received numerous awards, including the piano department's Achievement Award. During this time, she took part in the recording of the album "Finder's Keepers", with the Contemporary Jazz Big Band led by Michael MacAllister, a classmate, accomplished guitar player, and recipient of numerous awards, including the ASCAP Foundation Young Composer Award. Kotringo performed for three years as an accompanist for the voice department at Berklee and as a pianist for a church in Boston.

After receiving her degree in 2003, she moved to New York and spent a year performing at Detour, Garage, Kaveha's and St. Nicks.

=== Back in Japan ===
In the fall of 2005, Kotringo began to work in finding a way to express her own music with her voice, piano and her MacBook. The following March, a composition she sent to Ryuichi Sakamoto's "Radio Sakamoto" Audition Corner (broadcast on J-WAVE, a Tokyo-based FM station covering the Kanto Region) caught Sakamoto's attention. Later, a second single she submitted to the program, "Nichiyo Machi" (Waiting for a Sunday) was broadcast on air. These events lead her to participation in the LOHAS Classical Concert in Kyoto produced by Ryuichi Sakamoto in June, 2006.

=== Recording career ===
In November of the same year, she made her debut with the release of her first single, the Ryuichi Sakamoto-produced Konnichiwa, Mata Ashita, a tie-in song for the Gekkeikan company's "Tsuki" commercial. Sakamoto was impressed by the multitude of Kotringo's talents: the originality of composition, the superb performance on piano, her pure and virginal singing voice crossed with sounds of electronica, all combined to give the effect of visual imagery coming to life from actual pages of a musical score... just like looking at a picture book.

Since 2007 she has released seven original albums (songs in the birdcage, nemurugirl, sweet nest, trick & tweet, La memoire de mon bandwagon, Tsubame Novelette, and birdcore!), two cover albums (picnic album 1 & 2), and five soundtracks (Bear's School - Jackie & Katie, BECK, I Have to Buy New Shoes, Gourmet Girl Graffiti, and In This Corner of the World). The trick & tweet album from 2009 featured, as a bonus track, Children's World (こどものせかい; Kodomo no sekai), the ending theme song to the 2009 animated movie Mai Mai Miracle.

== About the name ==
The name "Kotringo" is a combination of sounds taken from the Japanese words for small birds (kotori) and apple (ringo). The name comes from the fact that Kotringo had always kept a pet bird since childhood, and because she used to eat an apple every day. The computer she uses in composing music has a related brand name.

== Discography ==
=== Albums ===
- [2007.06.27] Songs in the Birdcage
- [2008.01.23] nemurugirl (mini-album)
- [2008.09.10] Sweet Nest
- [2009.09.16] trick & tweet
- [2010.09.22] picnic album 1
- [2010.12.08] Bear's School~Jackie&Katie movie original sound track
- [2011.01.19] picnic album 2
- [2012.03.17] La memoire de mon bandwagon
- [2012.10.17] I Have to Buy New Shoes, Japanese movie soundtrack with Sakamoto Ryuichi
- [2013.01.16] Tsubame Novelette
- [2014.04.30] birdcore!
- [2015.03.25] Edible melodies ~ Gourmet Girl Graffiti Original Soundtrack
- [2016.11.09] In This Corner of the World Original Soundtrack
- [2017.11.08] Ame no Hakoniwa (雨の箱庭; Rainy Miniature Garden)

=== Singles ===
- [2006.11.29] Konnichiwa Mata Ashita (こんにちは またあした; Hello, See you Again Tomorrow)
- [2007.02.28] Nichiyo Machi (にちよ待ち; Waiting for a Sunday)
- [2007.09.19] Fuwafuwa Song
- [2008.08.13] Oideyo / summer (おいでよ / summer)
- [2011.04.27] Chiisana Anata E (ちいさなあなたへ～someday～)
- [2014.03.05] Dare ka Watashi O (誰か私を)
- [2017.04.20] Tadayou Kanjou (漂う感情)
