= Sherlock Hound =

Italian-Japanese anime television series

- Japanese Blu-ray cover art

名探偵ホームズ (Meitantei Hōmuzu)
- Genre: Action; Adventure; Mystery
- Created by: Arthur Conan Doyle
- Anime film

Sherlock Hound: Blue Ruby Chapter and Treasure at the Bottom of the Ocean Chapter
- Directed by: Hayao Miyazaki
- Written by: Sunao Katabuchi
- Studio: Tokyo Movie Shinsha
- Released: 11 March 1984
- Runtime: 46 minutes
- Anime television series
- Directed by: Hayao Miyazaki; Kyōsuke Mikuriya
- Produced by: Yoshimitsu Takahashi
- Written by: Hayao Miyazaki; Marco Pagot; Gi Pagot; Sunao Katabuchi
- Music by: Kentarō Haneda
- Studio: Radiotelevisione italiana; Tokyo Movie Shinsha
- Licensed by: NA: Pioneer Entertainment (former) Discotek Media; UK: Manga Entertainment
- Original network: Rai 1 (Italy); TV Asahi (Japan)
- English network: AU: Nine Network; UK: BBC One; US: HBO
- Original run: 6 November 1984 – 21 May 1985
- Episodes: 26
- Anime film

Sherlock Hound: Mrs. Hudson The Hostage Chapter and Aerial Battle at the Strait of Dover Chapter
- Directed by: Hayao Miyazaki
- Written by: Sunao Katabuchi
- Studio: Tokyo Movie Shinsha
- Released: 2 August 1986
- Runtime: 46 minutes
- icon

Sherlock Hound (名探偵ホームズ, Meitantei Hōmuzu; lit. "Famous Detective Holmes"), known also as Il fiuto di Sherlock Holmes, is an anime television series produced by Radiotelevisione italiana (RAI) and Tokyo Movie Shinsha (TMS). Based on the character Sherlock Holmes by Arthur Conan Doyle, almost all the characters are depicted as anthropomorphic dogs. The show featured regular appearances of Jules Verne–steampunk style technology, adding a 19th-century science-fiction atmosphere to the series. It consists of 26 episodes and aired between 1984 and 1985.

== Production ==
The series was a joint project between Japanese Tokyo Movie Shinsha (TMS) and Italian Radiotelevisione italiana (RAI). Hayao Miyazaki worked on six episodes in 1982 until problems with Arthur Conan Doyle's estate led to a suspension in production. By the time the issues were resolved Miyazaki had turned to other projects, and thus the remaining series was directed by Kyōsuke Mikuriya. The show was finally aired in 1984. The same year, before their television debut, a film version of two of the episodes directed by Miyazaki ("The Adventure of the Blue Carbuncle" and "Treasure Under the Sea") edited together was released alongside Nausicaä of the Valley of the Wind in Japanese theaters, entitled Meitantei Hōmuzu Gekijouban. Another film, compiling "Mrs. Hudson Is Taken Hostage" and "The White Cliffs of Dover" episodes was released in 1986 alongside Laputa: Castle in the Sky. Episode 3 of the series, "A Small Client", actually aired in the United States before it aired in Japan, as it was dubbed into English in 1982 (possibly commissioned by either TMS or RAI) and was broadcast on HBO in November 1983 under the title The Adventure of Sherlock Hound.

== Music ==
Two pieces of theme music are used for the Japanese version: The opening theme is "Sora Kara Koboreta Story" (lit. "Story Spilled From the Sky") and the ending theme is "Thames Gawa no Dance" (lit. "Dance of the Thames River"), both performed by the Japanese duo, Da Capo. The series' international versions had a single piece of theme music for the opening and ending credits. The frequent soloists are Joe Farrell on soprano, tenor and alto saxophones and flute (in his final recording) and Milt Jackson on vibes. This English theme is not included on the UK DVD's from Manga Entertainment, instead instrumentals of both the Japanese opening and ending themes were used.

== Characters ==
Sherlock Hound (ホームズ, Hōmuzu)
Voiced by: Taichirō Hirokawa (Japanese); Larry Moss (English); Elio Pandolfi (Italian)
Just like his original incarnation, he has a genius intellect and is extremely knowledgeable in multiple fields. He keeps a cool and logical head despite the situation. Unlike his original incarnation, however, his only drug habit is smoking a tobacco pipe. He keeps his apartment a mess and is regularly conducting chemical experiments that lead to clouds of noxious fumes. He also seems to have feelings for Mrs. Hudson, as does the rest of the male cast. He drives a Benz Velo.
Doctor Watson (ワトソン, Watoson)
Voiced by: Kōsei Tomita (Japanese); Lewis Arquette (English); Riccardo Garrone (Italian)
Hound's loyal companion, he is a trained doctor who returned to England shortly before meeting Hound. He tries his best to help Hound as he can, but has difficulty at times keeping up with Hound, both mentally and physically, being a bit overweight.
Mrs. Hudson (ハドソン夫人, Hadoson-fujin)
Voiced by: Yōko Asagami (Japanese); Patricia Parris (English); Cristina Grado (Italian)
Hound and Watson's landlady. In most adaptations, Holmes's long-suffering landlady is shown as middle-aged or older, but in this version she is a young comely widow and a love interest of many, including Holmes, Watson, and Moriarty (mostly Holmes), and given the first name Marie (マリー, Marī). Her late husband Jim was a pilot and Hound finds her contacts in the world of aviation useful; many of the local aviators are also former buddies of Mrs. Hudson's late husband and/or have strong romantic feelings for the caring gentle-natured Mrs. Hudson herself, and so they are always eager to assist in any way she asks. Mrs. Hudson displays a serenely-dignified and level-headed personality comparable to Hound's; she can also be quite quick and resourceful herself when need be, plus she appears to be both an experienced high-speed driver and a crack shot with a revolver. Miyazaki actually wanted to present her as the real brains of Baker Street, running rings around both Hound and his enemy Moriarty, but he was overruled.
Professor Moriarty (モリアーティ教授, Moriāti-kyōju)
Voiced by: Chikao Ōtsuka (Japanese); Hamilton Camp (English); Mauro Bosco (Italian)
Hound's archenemy. Unlike the rarely appearing mafia donnish Moriarty in the books, this Moriarty is portrayed as working personally on his plans without any sort of support network and frequently encountering Hound and his allies, being the main antagonist in the majority of the episodes. Still an intellectual, he is a master inventor, often the one responsible for the steam punk technology seen in the show, including his personal "steam car", a tractor and tank combination rather than a car. His plans can occasionally be very complex or outlandish that rely on one questioning or linking together unusual acts, which is often how Hound figures out what Moriarty is up to. Sometimes he acts as a mercenary to other criminals who are after what he normally wouldn't steal.
Smiley (スマイリー, Sumairī)
Voiced by: Mitsuo Senda (Japanese); Moss (English); Angelo Maggi (Italian)
One of Moriarty's henchmen, created for the show. Smiley is tall, lanky, has something of a limited intellect, a thick Cockney accent and a positive attitude. In the episodes directed by Hayao Miyazaki, he is colored a pea green, while in other episodes, he's medium brown. Before working for Moriarty, he and George/Todd were members of the Bengal Pirates that appeared in the first episode, though they escaped being arrested with the rest of the crew.
George/Todd (トッド, Toddo)
Voiced by: Hiroshi Masuoka (Japanese); Arquette (English); Maurizio Mattioli (Italian)
One of Moriarty's henchmen, created for the show George/Todd is small and squat, has a negative outlook on the situation, and is usually the first to criticize Moriarty or his plans. Early in the series in the English dub he is inconsistently called either George or Todd, sometimes within a single episode, eventually settling on Todd, though in the Japanese version he's only ever called Todd. The two are often used for comic relief. Before they worked for Moriarty, he, along with Smiley, was a member of the Bengal Pirates that appeared in the first episode, though they escaped being arrested with the rest of the crew. Director Hayao Miyazaki modeled the appearance of the character Todd on Kazuhide Tomonaga, the animation director for the series
Inspector Lestrade (レストレード警部, Resutorēdo-keibu)
Voiced by: Shōzō Iizuka (Japanese); Arquette (English); Enzo Consoli (Italian)
As Hound's go-to guy in the police force, he's also the first to call on Hound for assistance on a case. Though he is a well-meaning and passionate police officer, he's not the most attentive of people, and he also has a hotheaded and impulsive nature as well. He is usually assisted by several policemen in trying to catch and arrest Moriarty, but they always fail at trying to catch him and they seem to always end up landing themselves into comedic situations similar to that of the Keystone Cops.

== Releases ==
=== DVD ===
In 2002, Pioneer Entertainment released the series on DVD (Region 1, NTSC format). 6 volumes or 'Case Files' were released. Each disk was double sided with the Japanese version on one side and the English dubbed version on the other side.

On February 1, 2010, Manga Entertainment released the complete series on DVD (Region 2, PAL format) in the United Kingdom as a HMV exclusive set. It has since become available in other outlets. It only contains the English dubbed version. This release also lacks the episode title cards, though the episodes are listed on the DVD case and menus.

Discotek Media released the series in a complete, unabridged DVD box set with English and Japanese versions on September 30, 2014.

=== Blu-ray ===
On November 21, 2014, Bandai Visual released the restored complete series on Blu-ray (Region A, Japanese language only) in Japan as a 4-disc set. On November 29, 2022, Discotek Media released a Blu-ray of the restored series for North American home video based on the Bandai HD transfer, including both the Japanese and English dubs, restored promo clips, and a restored rare English dub of the pilot.

== Episodes ==
Broadcast order	Title	Directed by	Written by	Original release date
1	"He's the Famous Detective" / "The Four Signatures"; Transliteration: "Kare ga uwasa no meitantei" (Japanese: 彼がうわさの名探偵)	Kenji Hayakawa	Yoshihisa Araki	6 November 1984
Hound is returning to England, but while crossing the English Channel, the ship he's on is attacked by pirates who are after one of the passengers. With the aid of another passenger, Dr. John Watson, Hound attempts to save the day.
2	"The Evil Genius, Professor Moriarty" / "The Crown of Mazalin"; Transliteration: "Aku no tensai Moriāti kyōju" (Japanese: 悪の天才モリアーティ教授)	Kenji Hayakawa	Yoshihisa Araki	13 November 1984
An aristocrat's son is the main suspect after a crown on loan from the Queen goes missing. Hound is asked to investigate, not knowing Professor Moriarty has been watching the location. (Loosely based on "The Adventure of the Beryl Coronet.")
3	"Little Martha's Big Mystery!?" / "A Small Client"; Transliteration: "Chīsana Māsa no daijiken!?" (Japanese: 小さなマーサの大事件！？)	Hayao Miyazaki	Hayao Miyazaki	20 November 1984
Hound suspects Professor Moriarty for the rising counterfeit money problem in London, but is unable to find any leads until a little girl comes asking Hound to help her find her father. (Loosely based on "The Adventure of the Engineer's Thumb.")
4	"Mrs. Hudson Is Taken Hostage"; Transliteration: "Misesu Hadoson hitojichi jiken" (Japanese: ミセス・ハドソン人質事件)	Hayao Miyazaki	Sunao Katabuchi	27 November 1984
Professor Moriarty thinks he has found a weakness in Hound, his landlady Mrs. Hudson, and so sets about kidnapping her, but things don't go as planned. (Loosely based on "The Disappearance of Lady Frances Carfax;" the Holmes decoy from "The Empty House" and "The Mazarin Stone" is also referenced.)
5	"Blue Ruby" / "The Adventure of the Blue Carbuncle"; Transliteration: "Aoi rubī" (Japanese: 青い紅玉)	Hayao Miyazaki	Sunao Katabuchi	4 December 1984
An orphan girl named Polly pickpockets a gem Professor Moriarty has just stolen, and he is determined to stop at no end to get it back. He bag kidnaps Polly and demands to know where the gem is. It's up to Hound and Dr. Watson to rescue her.
6	"Solve the Mystery of the Green Balloon!" / "The Green Balloon"; Transliteration: "Midori no fūsen no nazo o toke!" (Japanese: 緑の風船のなぞをとけ！)	Sumio Tokoro	Yoshihisa Araki	11 December 1984
A mysterious green balloon lands in Hound's backyard, with a message asking for help as the sender is being held prisoner on Dolphin Island.
7	"The Great Chase of the Little Detectives!" / "A Sacred Image Disappears"; Transliteration: "Dai tsuiseki! Chibikko tantei-dan" (Japanese: 大追跡！ちびっこ探偵団)	Seiji Okuda	Yoshihisa Araki	18 December 1984
Moriarty succeeds in stealing a large gold statue, but Hound is able to track his escape, learning that Moriarty hid it somewhere by the docks, and must find it before Moriarty returns.
8	"The Speckled Band"; Transliteration: "Madara no himo" (Japanese: まだらのひも)	Kenji Hayakawa	Yoshihisa Araki	8 January 1985
A young girl returns to England after several years in America and finds her uncle is not quite who she remembers.
9	"Treasure Under the Sea"; Transliteration: "Kaitei no zaihō" (Japanese: 海底の財宝)	Hayao Miyazaki	Sunao Katabuchi	15 January 1985
The Royal Navy asks Hound and Watson to help them recover a submarine stolen by Professor Moriarty. (Loosely based on "The Adventure of the Bruce-Partington Plans.")
10	"The Air Battle Over Dover!" / "The White Cliffs of Dover"; Transliteration: "Dōbā kaikyō no dai kūchū-sen!" (Japanese: ドーバー海峡の大空中戦！)	Hayao Miyazaki	Sunao Katabuchi	22 January 1985
Someone has been sabotaging England's new Air Mail postal service to Europe, and it's up to Hound, Watson and Mrs. Hudson to find out who.
11	"The Targeted Giant Coin Bank" / "The Sovereign Gold Coins"; Transliteration: "Nerawareta kyodai chokin-bako" (Japanese: ねらわれた巨大貯金箱)	Nobuo Tomizawa - Hayao Miyazaki (uncredited)	Toshiya Itō	29 January 1985
Sherlock Hound and Doctor Watson are asked to investigate the disappearance of twenty Sovereign Gold Coins from a specially constructed safe. Although not officially credited, Hayao Miyazaki storyboarded and directed this episode.
12	"The Professor's Big Failure in the Storm!!" / "The Stormy Getaway"; Transliteration: "Kyōju arashi no dai shippai!!" (Japanese: 教授嵐の大失敗！！)	Sumio Tokoro	Yoshihisa Araki	5 February 1985
A large shipment of cash is being taken by carriage across the country, and due to sabotage the police are unable to escort the shipment, and so Hound is asked to shadow the shipment to ensure it arrives at its destination.
13	"Missing Freight Car!? The Professor's Big Magic Trick" / "The Runaway Freight Car"; Transliteration: "Kasha ga kieta!? Kyōju no dai majutsu" (Japanese: 貨車が消えた！？教授の大魔術)	Seiji Okuda	Tsunehisa Itō	12 February 1985
A freight car in the middle of a passenger train disappears en route to London, and Hound must figure out how.
14	"Gourmet! Coral Lobsters" / "The Coral Lobsters"; Transliteration: "Chinmi! Sango no robusutā" (Japanese: 珍味！さんごのロブスター)	Kenji Hayakawa	Yoshihisa Araki	19 February 1985
Moriarty has stolen a collection of diamond-encrusted coral lobster carvings and it's up to Hound and Watson to track him down.
15	"Did You See!? The Big Shining Thief" / "The Golden Statue of the Great Burglar"; Transliteration: "Mitaka! Pikapika no ōdorobō" (Japanese: 見たか！ピカピカの大どろぼう)	Kenji Hayakawa	Yoshihisa Araki	26 February 1985
When a bank's entire collection of gold is stolen the same night a sculptor disappears, Moriarty becomes the first suspect when sketches of a gold statue in his likeness are found at the sculptor's house.
16	"The Magic Castle! Holmes, Dead or Alive?" / "The Secret of the Sacred Cross Sword"; Transliteration: "Majō! Hōmuzu sei ka shi ka?" (Japanese: 魔城！ホームズ生か死か？)	Seiji Okuda	Tsunehisa Itō	5 March 1985
Hound and Watson are invited to the first unveiling of "The Sacred Sword of the Wizards" in decades, but when the safe containing it is broken into and the sword isn't even touched, it's up to Hound to figure out why.
17	"The Monster of the Thames River" / "The Adventure of the Thames Monster"; Transliteration: "Temuzu-gawa no kaibutsu" (Japanese: テムズ川の怪物)	Kenji Hayakawa	Tsunehisa Itō	12 March 1985
A sea monster seems to be attacking ships on the River Thames and devouring them whole, and after a passenger goes missing in one of the attacks and no body can be found, Hound is called in to find him.
18	"Blundered Operation at Loch Ness!" / "The Adventure of the Three Students"; Transliteration: "Nesu-ko ni chitta doji sakusen!" (Japanese: ネス湖に散ったドジ作戦！)	Kenji Hayakawa	Hayao Yamadori	19 March 1985
Hound must find three art students on holiday in London from France who have gone missing, while Inspector Lestrade tries to figure out why someone would steal artwork reproductions.
19	"The Soseki Kite Battle Over London!" / "The Rosetta Stone"; Transliteration: "Sōseki Rondon tako gassen!" (Japanese: 漱石・ロンドン凧合戦！)	Seiji Okuda	Toshirō Ishidō	26 March 1985
When the Rosetta Stone literally floats away from the British Museum, Hound wonders if it has to do with various countries' claims to the stone.
20	"Chase the Airship White Silver!" / "The White Silver Getaway!"; Transliteration: "Hikōsen shirogane-gō o oe!" (Japanese: 飛行船しろがね号を追え！)	Takaya Mizutani	Yoshihisa Araki	2 April 1985
Moriarty and his gang manage to steal a shipment of gold, but Inspector Lestrade's investigation is making it difficult for the gang to get the gold out of London. Meanwhile, Hound and Watson investigates an odd break-in and robbery at a company making a new blimp.
21	"Buzz Buzz! The Fly Fly Mecha Operation" / "The Disappearance of the Splendid Royal Horse"; Transliteration: "Bunbun! Hae hae meka sakusen" (Japanese: ブンブン！はえはえメカ作戦)	Takaya Mizutani	Yoshihisa Araki	9 April 1985
There's a new thief in London, one who puts Moriarty to shame, and their next target appears to be the Queen's favorite horse.
22	"Grand Flight Championship of Chaos!?" / "Disturbance, the World Flight Championship!"; Transliteration: "Hachamecha hikōki dai rēsu" (Japanese: ハチャメチャ飛行機大レース)	Takaya Mizutani	Yoshihisa Araki	16 April 1985
Moriarty enters a prestigious airplane race, with the intent of sabotaging his way into first place, including stealing parts from other entrants to make his plane the best. Mrs. Hudson, Hound and Watson enter the race in hopes of stopping him.
23	"Game of Wits! Parrot vs. Professor" / "The Secret of the Parrot"; Transliteration: "Chie kurabe! Ōmu tai kyōju" (Japanese: 知恵くらべ！オウム対教授)	Kenji Hayakawa	Yoshihisa Araki	23 April 1985
When Moriarty goes to great lengths to steal a parrot off a train, Hound takes up the case to find out what's so special about this parrot.
24	"Listen! The Tribute to Moriarty" / "The Bell of Big Ben"; Transliteration: "Kike! Moriāti sanka" (Japanese: 聞け！モリアーティ讃歌)	Takashi Tanazawa	Tsunehisa Itō	7 May 1985
Big Ben's bell has been burglarized, but bureaucrats beseech Hound to keep that bit buried while they search, so as to burke blemishing England's dignity.
25	"Chaos! The Doll Swap Case" / "The Priceless French Doll"; Transliteration: "Dai konran! Ningyō surikae jiken" (Japanese: 大混乱！人形すりかえ事件)	Kenji Hayakawa	Yoshihisa Araki	14 May 1985
Moriarty is after a large diamond, but after hiding it in a doll, he ends up with more than he bargained for.
26	"Goodbye, Holmes! The Last Case" / "The Missing Bride Affair"; Transliteration: "Sayonara Hōmuzu! Saigo no jiken" (Japanese: さよならホームズ！最後の事件)	Kenji Hayakawa	Hayao Yamadori	21 May 1985
A bride vanishes moments before she is to walk down the aisle, and the couples' families come to Sherlock Hound for help, but when secrets from the bride's past come to light Hound has to weigh his options.

== See also ==
- Sherlock Holmes pastiches
