= Fumiyo Kōno =

Japanese manga artist

Fumiyo Kōno (Fumiyo Kouno)
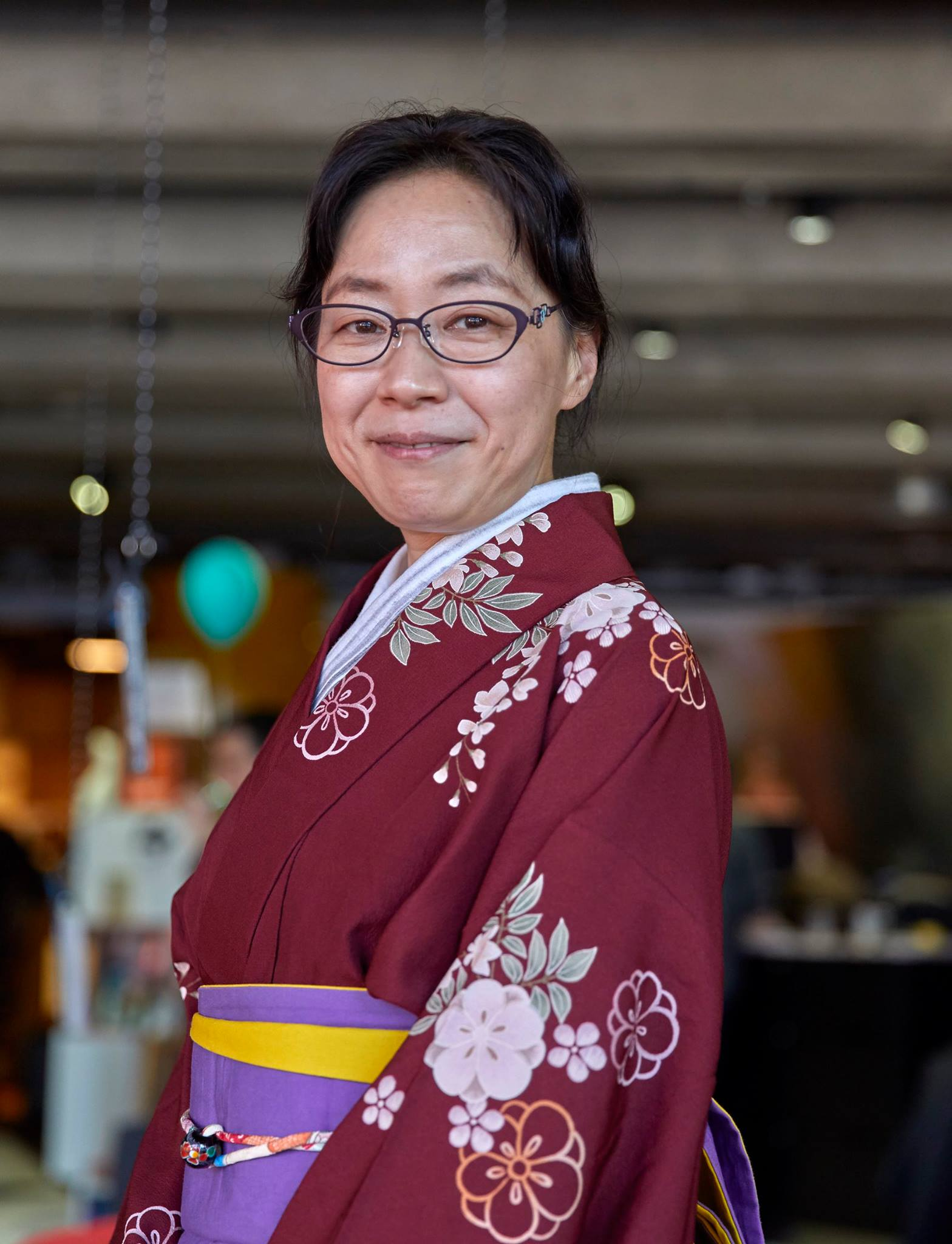
- Fumiyo Kōno, at the 2018 Stockholm International Comics Festival.
- Born: 28 September 1968 (age 58) Nishi-ku, Hiroshima
- Areas: Manga artist and writer
- Notable works: Town of Evening Calm, Country of Cherry Blossoms; In This Corner of the World

Fumiyo Kōno (こうの 史代, Kōno Fumiyo; born 28 September 1968), commonly romanized Fumiyo Kouno, is a Japanese manga artist from Nishi-ku, Hiroshima, known for her 2004 manga Town of Evening Calm, Country of Cherry Blossoms and her 2007 manga In This Corner of the World which got an anime film adaptation in 2016 by MAPPA.

== Biography ==
She was born in Hiroshima in 1968 and began drawing manga when she was in junior high school. She states that she began drawing manga because her parents would not often buy her manga. Kōno studied science at Hiroshima University and moved to Tokyo, becoming an assistant to Katsuyuki Toda, Aki Morino, and Fumiko Tanigawa. Kōno made her commercial debut in 1995 with Machikado Hana Da Yori. She feels that Osamu Tezuka and Fujiko Fujio were among her early influences, but then she was inspired by Sanpei Shirato's literary style and at present, she takes inspiration from Yu Takita's versatility. She graduated from the University of the Air in 2001 with a major in Humanities.

== Works ==
Selected works. (Titles without an English version are given a literal translation enclosed in quotation marks.)

- Machikado Hana Da yori [Machikado hanadayori] (街角花だより; "Street-corner tidings of flowers" (Note: The title refers to a flower shop.)) (serialized 1995–1996 and 2002–2003, collected 2007, Futabasha), 1 volume
- Pippira Nōto [Pippira chō] (ぴっぴら帳; Pippira Note) (serialized 1997–2004, collected 2009, Futabasha) (2017 reprint Futabasha), 2 volumes
  - Pippira Nōto 1 (2000 Futabasha)
  - Pippira Nōto: Kanketsuhen (2004 Futabasha)
- Kokko-san (こっこさん; "Mister Coco" (Note: The titular "Kokko-san" is a rooster, equivalent of "Mister Coco".)) (serialized 1999–2001, collected 2005, Ohzora Shuppan)
- Nagai Michi (長い道; "A long road" (Note: The title could be rendered as "A long road" or "The long road", but the story is about a misfit couple who has "a long road" ahead of them. (Foreign translations have rendered it as "A long road" too.))) (serialized 2001–2004, collected 2005, Futabasha) (2009 reprint Futabasha)
- Kappa no Neneko (かっぱのねね子; "Neneko the kappa-girl" (Note: The title is literally "(girl name) the kappa", rendered using "kappa-girl".)) (script Akiho Kousaka, serialized 2001–2002, Fukuinkan Shoten)
- Town of Evening Calm, Country of Cherry Blossoms (夕凪の街 桜の国, Yūnagi no Machi, Sakura no Kuni) (serialized 2003–2004, collected 2004, Futabasha)
- San-san Roku (さんさん録; "San-san list [List for Sanpei]" (Note: The titular "San-san" is Sanpei as addressed by his departed wife. (Foreign translations have rendered it as "Diary for Sanpei" or just "For Sanpei".))) (serialized 2004–2006, collected 2006, Futabasha), 2 volumes
- In This Corner of the World (この世界の片隅に, Kono Sekai no Katasumi ni) (serialized 2007–2009, collected 2008–2009, Futabasha) (2011 reprint Futabasha), 3 volumes
- Heibon Kurabu (平凡倶楽部) (serialized 2009–2010, Futabasha)
- Boorupen Kojiki (ぼおるぺん古事記) (serialized 2011–2012, Heibonsha)
- Ano Toki, Kono Hon (あのとき、この本) (Fukuinkan Shoten)
- Hi no Tori (日の鳥) (serialized 2012–2016, Nihon Bungeisha)
- Hyakuichi (百一 hyakuichi) (serialized 2018–present, Nihon Bungeisha)

== Awards ==
- 2004 Japan Media Arts Festival Grand Prize (Manga Division) for Town of Evening Calm, Country of Cherry Blossoms
- 2005 Tezuka Osamu Cultural Prize Creative Award for Town of Evening Calm, Country of Cherry Blossoms
- 2009 Japan Media Arts Festival Excellence Prize (Manga Division) for Kono Sekai no Katasumi ni
