= Sunao Katabuchi =

Japanese screenwriter (born 1960)

- 片渕 須直
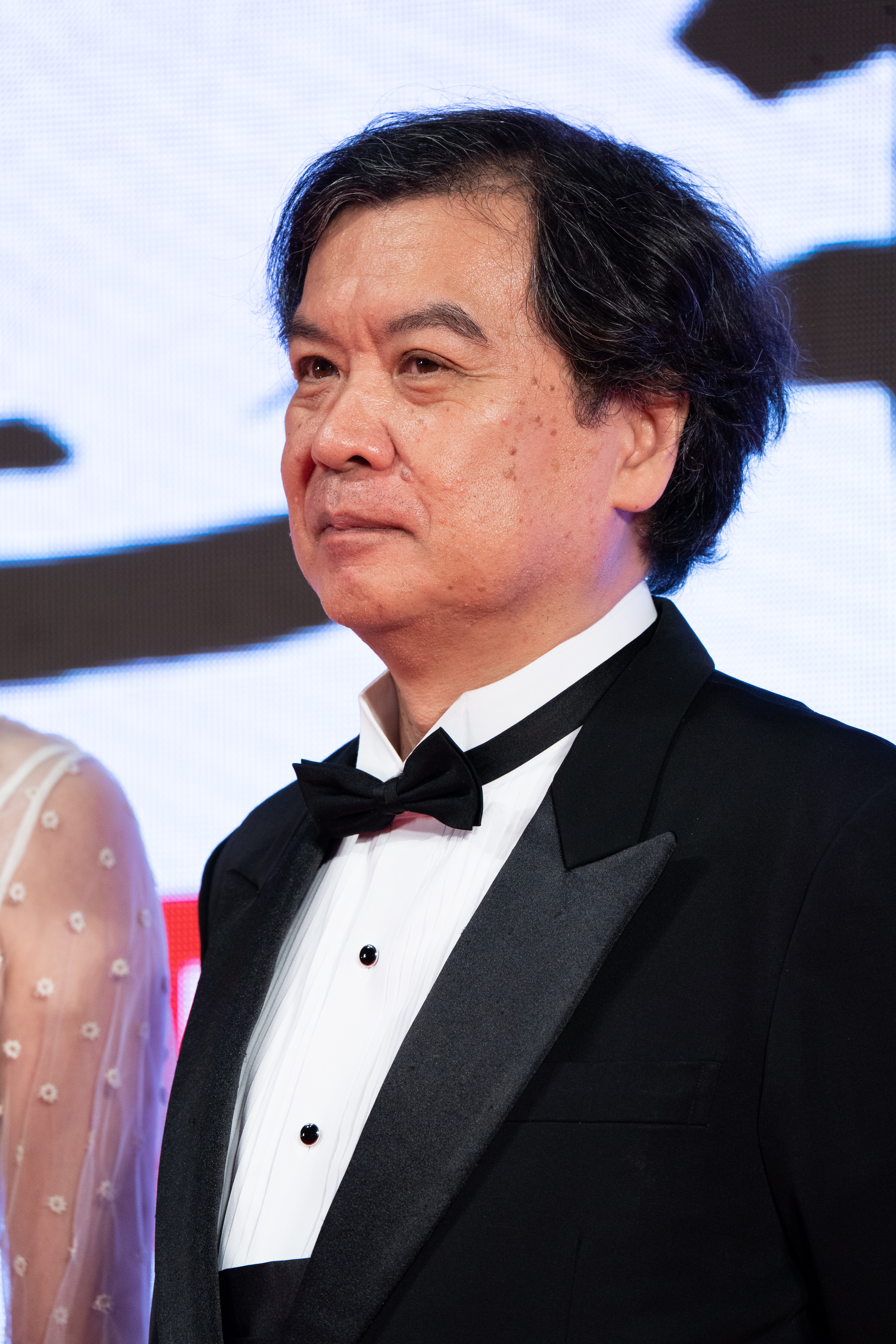
- Sunao Katabuchi in 2019
- Born: 1960 (age 65–66); Hirakata, Japan
- Education: Nihon University
- Occupations: Director; film director; animation director; screenwriter; storyboard artist
- Years active: 1982–present
- Employers: Telecom Animation Film (1982–1985); Mushi Production (1986–1992); Studio 4°C (1992~2000); Contrail (2019–present) (Note: Founder and director (取締役))
- Known for: Black Lagoon; Mai Mai Miracle; In This Corner of the World
- Spouse: Chie Uratani

Sunao Katabuchi (片渕 須直, Katabuchi Sunao; born 1960) is a Japanese animation director, screenwriter, and storyboard artist. He is director of Contrail Co. Ltd. He has been a part-time lecturer at Nihon University College of Art since 2006, and a Project Professor at the college of Art of at the same university since 2018. He has also served as a part-time lecturer at the Graduate School of Tokyo University of the Arts since 2013. He is married to a fellow director of anime Chie Uratani.

== Early life and education ==
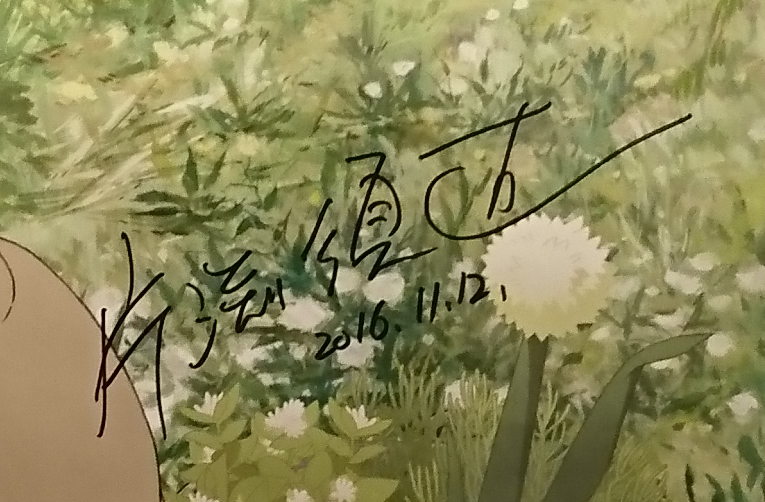
Sunao Katabuchi's signature, 2016

Katabuchi was born in Hirakata, Osaka in 1960.

While studying at Nihon University College of Art's Department of Cinema, he participated in the writing team of Sherlock Hound directed by Hayao Miyazaki.

== Career ==
After graduating, he joined Telecom Animation Film. In the same year, Hayao Miyazaki asked him to participate in Nausicaä of the Valley of the Wind as a scriptwriter, but he had to decline for various reasons.

He traveled to the U.S. several times to work on Little Nemo: Adventures in Slumberland, a Japan-U.S. co-production of an animated film produced by Telecom, but decided to leave the company after becoming fed up with the project going astray as it was being pushed around by the American side. Then he started working at Mushi Production.

He was seconded to Studio Ghibli from Mushi Productions to work as an assistant director for Hayao Miyazaki on Kiki's Delivery Service in 1989. Katabuchi was originally going to direct the film, but when the sponsoring company made it clear that they had no intention of investing in anything other than a film directed by Hayao Miyazaki, Katabuchi stepped aside.

Katabuchi joined Studio 4°C in 1992. Around this time, he was asked to train new directors and animators for Studio Ghibli, which had changed from a system of recruiting freelance staff for each production to a proper company structure and began hiring new employees. When he finished his work at Ghibli, they wanted him to stay on, but he refused.

He made his directorial debut with the Nippon Animation TV series Famous Dog Lassie in 1996.

He made his feature film directorial debut with Princess Arete. After working on various outside projects, he returned to Studio 4 °C and began work on Princess Arete in 1998. The film was released in 2001 and won Excellent Works of the Year in the Domestic Feature Film Category at Tokyo International Anime Fair in 2002.

After Princess Arete, Katabuchi moved his main activities to Madhouse.

He directed, composed and wrote the screenplay for Black Lagoon series since 2006.

In 2016, Katabuchi directed In This Corner of the World produced by MAPPA, which was released on November 12, 2016, in Japan, and planned to be released in fifteen countries including UK, France, Germany, Mexico and US.

== Works ==
=== Films ===
- Kiki's Delivery Service - Assistant Director, 1989
- Upon The Planet (この星の上に, Kono Hoshi no Ue ni) - Director, 1998
- Princess Arete (アリーテ姫, Arīte Hime) - Director, Writer, 2001
- Mai Mai Miracle (マイマイ新子と千年の魔法, Maimai Shinko to Sennen no Mahō) - Director, Writer, 2009
- In This Corner of the World (この世界の片隅に, Kono Sekai no Katasumi ni) - Director, Writer, 2016
- In This Corner (and Other Corners) of the World (この世界の(さらにいくつもの）片隅に, Kono Sekai no (Sarani Ikutsumono)Katasumi ni) - Director, Writer, 2019
- The Mourning Children: Nagiko and the Girls Wearing Tsurubami Black (TBA)

=== Television productions ===
- Sherlock Hound - Writer, 1984–1985
- The Blinkins: The Bear And The Blizzard - Director, 1986
- Famous Dog Lassie - Director, 1996
- Black Lagoon - Director, Writer, 2006
- Black Lagoon: The Second Barrage - Director, Writer, 2006

=== OVA ===
- Black Lagoon: Roberta's Blood Trail - Director, Writer, 2010

=== Video games ===
- Ace Combat 04: Shattered Skies (2001) - Director/writer for side-story movie
- Ace Combat 5: The Unsung War (2004) - Story writer
- Ace Combat 7: Skies Unknown (2019) - Story writer
- Ace Combat 8: Wings of Theve (2026) - Story writer

=== Commercials ===
- Panasonic 3CCD lovery size - Animation Director, 2004
- Toyota ITS Ha:mo Concept movie Road to promise - Director, 2012
- NHK Flowers blossom (花は咲く, hana wa saku) PV of animation version - Director, 2013

== Awards ==
- Princess Arete – Tokyo International Anime Fair - Excellent works of the year in Domestic Feature Film Category (2002)
- Mai Mai Miracle - Ottawa International Animation Festival - Prize Winning in Feature Film Competition (2009)
- Mai Mai Miracle - the 14th Japan Media Arts Festival - The Excellence Award in the Animation Division (2010)
- Mai Mai Miracle - 29th Brussels International Animation Film Festival - Anima 2010 BETV/Audience Awards for Feature Film Competition (2010)
- Mai Mai Miracle - the 20th Cine Junior International Film Festival - the Audience Award
- In This Corner of the World - Hiroshima International Film Festival - Hiroshima Peace Film Award Winner (2016)
- In This Corner of the World - 90th Kinema Junpo Awards - Best Director / Best Japanese Film (2017)
- In This Corner of the World - 71st Mainichi Film Awards - Ōfuji Noburō Award (2017)
- In This Corner of the World - 59th Blue Ribbon Awards - Best Director (2017)
- In This Corner of the World - 26th Tokyo Sports Film Award -Best Film (2017)
- In This Corner of the World - 40th Japan Academy Prize - Best Animation of the Year (2017)
- In This Corner of the World - 59th Culture of Child Welfare Award - Film/Media category (2017)
- In This Corner of the World - 67th The Minister of Education, Culture, Sports, Science and Technology's Art Encouragement Prize - Film category (2017)
