= 2004 in animation =

2004 in animation is an overview of notable events, including notable awards, list of films released, television show debuts and endings, and notable deaths.

== Events ==
=== January ===
- January 4: The King of the Hill episode "Rich Hank, Poor Hank" premieres on Fox, this was the final episode to be produced entirely in cel animation, the show officially switches over to digital ink and paint afterwards. The episode was seen by over 7.5 million viewers that night.
- January 5:
  - The first episode of Dragon airs.
  - The first episode of Little Red Tractor airs.
- January 16: Teacher's Pet, produced by the Walt Disney Company, is released. It serves as the series finale. Also, this is Disney's return of their PG-rated cartoons since Treasure Planet in 2002 after their failed attempt of "bringing back" the G-rated cartoons owing to the compromised character deaths in Brother Bear that was released last November.
- January 25: The Simpsons episode "Diatribe of a Mad Housewife" is first broadcast, guest starring the Olsen Twins and novelists Tom Clancy and Thomas Pynchon.
- January 28: Winx Club first airs on the Italian television channel Rai 2.

=== February ===
- February 1: Futari wa Pretty Cure, the first installment of the Pretty Cure franchise, first airs.
- February 7: The 31st Annie Awards are held.
- February 11: Jean-François Laguionie's Black Mor's Island premieres..
- February 29: 76th Academy Awards:
  - Finding Nemo directed by Andrew Stanton wins Best Animated Feature Film.
  - Harvie Krumpet directed by Adam Elliot wins Best Animated Short Film.

=== March ===
- March 4: The first episode of Tripping the Rift airs.
- March 6: Mamoru Oshii's Ghost in the Shell 2: Innocence premieres.
- March 17: Season 8 of South Park begins on Comedy Central with the premiere of the episode "Good Times with Weapons".
- March 20:
  - Immortal, directed by and based on Enki Bilal's comic book La Foire aux immortels premieres.
  - The Danish film Terkel in Trouble airs.

=== April ===
- April 2: Home on the Range, produced by the Walt Disney Company, is released. It flops at box office as Disney would focus working on CG animated feature films while suspending the traditional hand-drawn animated films for 5 years.
- April 3: The first episode of Danny Phantom airs.
- April 12: The first episode of Peep and the Big Wide World airs to positive acclaim.
- April 17: Bill Plympton's Hair High is first released.
- April 18: The Simpsons episode "My Big Fat Geek Wedding" is first broadcast, guest starring creator Matt Groening.
- April 25: Season 3 of Aqua Teen Hunger Force begins on Adult Swim with the premiere of the episode "Video Ouija".
- April 28: The earliest known Eddsworld animation goes online.

=== May ===
- May 7: The Adventures of Jimmy Neutron, Boy Genius and The Fairly OddParents hour-long crossover special event, "Jimmy Timmy Power Hour" premieres on Nickelodeon, reeling in a total of nearly five million viewers for its premiere.
- May 10: Voice actor Greg Burson is arrested after barricading himself inside his home, holding three female roommates hostage while being drunk and carrying a gun.
- May 11: The pilot for Invader Zim makes its debut on DVD.
- May 12–31: 2004 Cannes Film Festival: Jonas Geirnaert, a young Belgian film student, sends in an unfinished animated short, Flatlife, to the festival, which promptly wins the Jury Prize for Best Short Film. This launches his media career in Flanders.
- May 15: Shrek 2 premiers during the 2004 Cannes Film Festival.
- May 17: The Simpsons episode Bart-Mangled Banner premieres on Fox, and became controversial in the United States for satirizing the U.S. Patriot Act.
- May 23:
  - King of the Hill concludes its eighth season on Fox with the episode "Talking Shop". The episode was watched by over 6.1 million viewers that night.
  - The Simpsons concludes its 15th season on Fox with the episode "Fraudcast News". The episode was watched by over 9.4 million viewers that night.
- May 24: The first episode of Kikoriki aired.
- May 31: The first episode of Peppa Pig aired.

=== June ===
- June 11: Season 2 of The Grim Adventures of Billy & Mandy begins on Cartoon Network with the premiere of the episodes "Spider's Little Daddy/Tricycle of Terror". This was the first season of the show to not be related to its parent series Grim & Evil.
- June 14: Cartoon Network ends its "Powerhouse" era and begins its "CN City" era, the channel's logo was also rebranded for the first time, giving it the "CN" look. Both eras are considered by fans to be the Golden Age of Cartoon Network.
- June 17: Kim Jun-ok's Tentacolino, a sequel to the notorious animated film The Legend of the Titanic, was released.
- June 19: The first episode of Winx Club airs.
- June 22: The Scooby-Doo direct-to-video film Scooby-Doo! and the Loch Ness Monster releases on VHS and DVD.

=== July ===
- Unknown date in July: Happy Tree Friends Volume 3 - Third Strike makes its first theatrical debut with episodes 8 to 18 of Season 2.
- July 2: The Fairly OddParents half-hour special "Crash Nebula" premieres on Nickelodeon, this was the first episode from Season 5 to premiere.
  - It was intended as a pilot episode for a planned spin-off series. This episode ran a few times before it was removed from reruns. Nickelodeon rejected the spin-off attempt for many reasons.
- July 9: The Adventures of Jimmy Neutron, Boy Genius concludes its second season on Nickelodeon with the TV movie "Win, Lose and Kaboom!".
- July 17: Katsuhiro Otomo's Steamboy airs.
- July 23: The Fairly OddParents TV movie "Channel Chasers" premieres on Nickelodeon, its premiere reeled in a total of over 3 million viewers that night. Despite it not being the final episode, fans of the show see this film as the perfect series finale.
- July 30: The Grim Adventures of Billy & Mandy concludes its second season on Cartoon Network with the episodes "Which Came First?/Substitute Teacher".
- July 31: The first episode of Justice League Unlimited airs.

=== August ===
- August 1: The final episode of Rugrats airs.
- August 9: Donald Duck receives a star at the Hollywood Walk of Fame.
- August 13: Foster's Home for Imaginary Friends makes its premiere on Cartoon Network with the TV movie "House of Bloo's".
- August 16: The first episode of LazyTown airs.
- August 29: The first episode of Atomic Betty airs.

=== September ===
- September 5: Hayao Miyazaki's Howl's Moving Castle was first released.
- September 6: The first episodes of The Tofus airs.
- September 7: The first episode of Miss Spider's Sunny Patch Friends airs.
- September 9: SIP Animation and the newly rebranded Jetix Europe announce the work of a new co-production tentatively titled The Insiders. The show would eventually premiere as A.T.O.M. - Alpha Teens on Machines in 2005.
- September 11: The first episode of The Batman airs.
- September 13: The first episode of Higglytown Heroes airs.
- September 19: Laura's Star by Piet De Rycker and Thilo Graf Rothkirch premieres.
- September 22: The first episode of Bro'Town airs.
- September 25: Samurai Jack airs its final episode of its original run.

=== October ===
- October 1:
  - The first episode of The Koala Brothers aired.
  - DreamWorks Animation's Shark Tale premieres in theaters. It originally gained some controversy for the inclusion of potentially offensive stereotypes of Italian-Americans as the Italian American One Voice Coalition demanded these results to be censored.
  - Season 3 of The Grim Adventures of Billy & Mandy begins on Cartoon Network with the premiere of the episodes "Super Zero/Sickly Sweet".
- October 3: Cartoon Network ceased from airing classic Looney Tunes/Merrie Melodies shorts after today due to Looney Tunes: Back in Action being a box-office bomb.
  - Though Looney Tunes/Merries Melodies reruns would later air on the network between 2009 & New Year's Day of 2010, and then officially return in March of 2011.
- October 11:
  - The first episode of The Backyardigans aired.
  - The first episode of Maya & Miguel airs.
  - The SpongeBob SquarePants episodes "SpongeBob Meets the Strangler/Pranks a Lot" premiere on Nickelodeon, thus concluding the third season of the show.
    - These were intended to be the final episodes before the first movie; but in September, the show was renewed for a fourth season.
  - The first episode of Postcards from Buster airs.
  - PBS Kids GO! was launched.
- October 12: Episodes 21-26 of Invader Zim make their debut on DVD in the U.S.
- October 21: Robert Zemeckis' The Polar Express was first released.
- October 22:
  - Foster's Home for Imaginary Friends concludes its first season on Cartoon Network with the episode "Bloooo".
  - The Grim Adventures of Billy & Mandy episode "Five O' Clock Shadows" premieres on Cartoon Network. This was the final episode to be associated with its parent series Grim & Evil.
- October 24:
  - The first Nicktoons Film Festival aired and organized.
  - Aqua Teen Hunger Force concludes its third season on Adult Swim with the episode "Carl (Spacegate World)".
- October 27: The first episode of Drawn Together airs as it features extremely kid-unfriendly parodies of classic cartoon characters.

=== November ===
- November 5:
  - The first episode of Cartoon Alley airs.
  - The Walt Disney Company and Pixar released The Incredibles in theaters.
- November 7:
  - The first episode of Perfect Hair Forever aired.
  - The first episode of 6teen aired.
  - Season 9 of King of the Hill begins on Fox with the premiere of the episode "A Rover Runs Through It", which guest stars Henry Winkler as himself. The episode was seen by over 6.8 million viewers that night.
  - Season 16 of The Simpsons begins on Fox with the latest Treehouse of Horror installment "Treehouse of Horror XV", The episode was seen by nearly 11.3 million viewers that night.
- November 8: The first episode of ToddWorld airs.
- November 9: The Walt Disney Company and Disneytoon Studios released Mickey's Twice Upon a Christmas is a direct-to-video film was released.
- November 11: The third and final season of The Adventures of Jimmy Neutron, Boy Genius begins on Nickelodeon with the premiere of the hour-long special "Attack of the Twonkies".
- November 14: 9th Animation Kobe was held.
- November 19:
  - The SpongeBob SquarePants Movie was first released. It received mixed to positive reviews. The re-animated collab Rehydrated version was released on YouTube in 2022.
  - The first episode of Hi Hi Puffy AmiYumi airs.

=== December ===
- December 1: The first episode of Poko aired.
- December 9: Áron Gauder's The District! premiered.
- December 12: Happy Tree Friends - Winter Break movie premieres on MTV. It adds episodes 22 to 24 of Season 2. The current release date of episode 24 is wrong, because its written January 4, 2004, the current is December 15th 2003.
- December 15: South Park concludes its eighth season on Comedy Central with the Christmas special "Woodland Critter Christmas". This would be the final Christmas special of the show until Season 18's "#HappyHolograms".
- December 25: 20th Century Fox's Fat Albert, the live action/animated adaptation of Filmation's Fat Albert and the Cosby Kids and the last Fat Albert project to date, premieres. It was a box office failure.
- December 28: Duck and Cover and Popeye the Sailor Meets Sindbad the Sailor were added to the National Film Registry.
- December 31: After 32 years, the final episode of Loeki de Leeuw aired. It was a series of stop-motion shorts which served as bumpers before and after commercial breaks on Dutch television.

=== Specific date unknown ===
- The animated Kotex commercial with the infamous Red Dot, used as the referred "period", gained notoriety for its exploits in front of children owing to their limited understanding, which caused damaging sells to the product as Kimberly-Clark would eliminate the slogan from their marketing campaign to avoid further verbal abuse.

== Awards ==
- Academy Award for Best Animated Feature: Finding Nemo
- Academy Award for Best Animated Short Film: Harvie Krumpet
- Animation Kobe Feature Film Award: Ghost in the Shell 2: Innocence
- Annecy International Animated Film Festival Cristal du long métrage: Oseam
- Annie Award for Best Animated Feature: The Incredibles
- Goya Award for Best Animated Film: Pinocchio 3000
- Japan Media Arts Festival Animation Award: Mind Game
- Mainichi Film Awards - Animation Grand Award: The Place Promised in Our Early Days

== Films released ==
- January 16 - Teacher's Pet (United States) (produced in 2003)
- January 17 - Dead Leaves (Japan)
- January 22 - The Butterfly Lovers (China)
- February 9 - Pinocchio 3000 (Canada, France, and Spain)
- February 10:
  - The Lion King 1½ (United States)
  - VeggieTales: An Easter Carol (United States)
- February 11 - The Island of Black Mor (France)
- February 14 - Saint Seiya: Heaven Chapter ~ Overture (Japan)
- February 20 - Clifford's Really Big Movie (limited)
- March 6:
  - Ghost in the Shell 2: Innocence (Japan)
  - One Piece: Curse of the Sacred Sword (Japan)
- March 7 - Doraemon: Nobita in the Wan-Nyan Spacetime Odyssey (Japan)
- March 9 - Winnie the Pooh: Springtime with Roo (United States)
- March 18 - Boo, Zino & the Snurks (Germany and Spain)
- March 24:
  - Los balunis en la aventura del fin del mundo (Spain)
  - Immortel (France)
- April 1 - Derrick – Duty Calls! (Germany and Ireland)
- April 2:
  - Glup (Spain) (produced in 2003)
  - Home on the Range (United States)
  - Terkel in Trouble (Denmark)
- April 6 - Corto Maltese: La maison dorée de Samarkand (France)
- April 7 - Charley and Mimmo (France, Luxembourg, and South Korea)
- April 17:
  - Crayon Shin-chan: The Storm Called: The Kasukabe Boys of the Evening Sun (Japan)
  - Detective Conan: Magician of the Silver Sky (Japan)
  - Hair High (United States)
- April 18 - Appleseed (Japan)
- April 23:
  - Kate - the Taming of the Shrew (Italy)
  - Clifford's Really Big Movie (United States)
- May 18 - VeggieTales: A Snoodle's Tale (United States)
- May 19 - Shrek 2 (United States)
- June 22 - Scooby-Doo! and the Loch Ness Monster (United States)
- June 24 - McDull, prince de la bun (Hong Kong)
- June 30 - Les Aventures extraordinaires de Michel Strogoff (France)
- July 8 - Patoruzito (Argentina)
- July 9 - MovieComic: The Movie (Brazil)
- July 12 - Stellaluna (United States and Canada)
- July 17:
  - Pokémon: Destiny Deoxys (Japan)
  - Steamboy (Japan)
- July 24:
  - The Great Pig Pirate Mateo (South Korea)
  - Lady Death: The Motion Picture (United States)
- August 3 - Bratz: Starrin' & Stylin' (United States)
- August 7 - Mind Game (Japan)
- August 13 - Yu-Gi-Oh! The Movie: Pyramid of Light (Japan)
- August 17 - Mickey, Donald, Goofy: The Three Musketeers (United States)
- August 21 - Naruto the Movie: Snow Princess' Book of Ninja Arts (Japan)
- August 27 - Mobile Suit Gundam SEED: Special Edition I – The Empty Battlefield (Japan)
- August 31 - VeggieTales: Sumo of the Opera (United States)
- September 4 - Strings (Denmark, Sweden, Norway, and United Kingdom)
- September 5 - The Easter Egg Adventure (United States)
- September 14 - G.I. Joe: Valor vs. Venom (United States)
- September 24 - Mobile Suit Gundam SEED: Special Edition II – The Far-Away Dawn (Japan)
- September 26 - Laura's Star (Germany and Bulgaria)
- September 28:
  - Barbie as the Princess and the Pauper (United States)
  - Tonka Tough Truck Adventures: The Biggest Show on Wheels (United States)
  - Bob the Builder: Snowed Under: The Bobblesberg Winter Games (United States)
- September 30 - Balto III: Wings of Change (United States)
- October 1 - Shark Tale (United States)
- October 5:
  - Care Bears: Journey to Joke-a-lot (United States and Canada)
  - ¡Mucha Lucha!: The Return of El Maléfico (United States)
  - Nine Dog Christmas (United States)
- October 12:
  - Dragons: Fire and Ice (Canada)
  - Felix the Cat Saves Christmas (United States)
  - The Nutcracker and the Mouseking (Russia, Germany, United States, and United Kingdom)
- October 19 - Bionicle 2: Legends of Metru Nui (United States)
- October 22:
  - The Legend of Buddha (India)
  - Mobile Suit Gundam SEED: Special Edition III – The Rumbling Sky (Japan)
- October 28 - Neznayka and the Barrabass (Russia)
- November 5:
  - The Incredibles (United States)
  - The Little Polar Bear: A Visitor from the South Pole (Germany)
- November 9:
  - Mickey's Twice Upon a Christmas (United States)
  - Popeye's Voyage: The Quest for Pappy (Canada and United States)
- November 10 - The Polar Express (United States)
- November 14 - Muhammad: The Last Prophet (United States)
- November 16:
  - Kangaroo Jack: G'Day U.S.A.! (United States)
  - LeapFrog: Talking Words Factory II - Code Word Caper (United States)
- November 19 - The SpongeBob SquarePants Movie (United States)
- November 20:
  - Howl's Moving Castle (Japan)
  - The Place Promised in Our Early Days (Japan)
- November 23 - In Search of Santa (United States)
- November 24 - LeapFrog: Math Circus (United States)
- December 1:
  - Souvenir from the Capital (Russia)
  - Supertramps (Spain)
- December 2 - My Little Pony: Dancing in the Clouds (United States)
- December 3 - Frank and Wendy (Estonia)
- December 4 - Blade of the Phantom Master (South Korea)
- December 9:
  - The District! (Hungary)
  - Teo, Intergalactic Hunter (Spain and Argentina)
- December 10 - Circleen: Little Big Mouse (Denmark)
- December 23:
  - Alosha (Russia)
  - Tottoko Hamtaro Ham Ham Paradise! The Movie: Hamtaro and the Demon of the Mysterious Picture Book Tower (Japan)
  - Inuyasha the Movie: Fire on the Mystic Island (Japan)
- Specific date unknown:
  - Genghis Khan (Italy)
  - Homeland (India)
  - Tentacolino (Italy)
  - Tracing Jake (Japan)

== Television series debuts ==
Date	Title	Channel	Year
January 18	Whoopi's Littleburg	Nickelodeon	2004
January 19	The Koala Brothers	Playhouse Disney	2004–2007
January 23	Dave the Barbarian	Disney Channel	2004–2005
January 28	Winx Club	RAI	2004–2019
January 31	Transformers: Energon	Cartoon Network	2004-2005
February 16	Witch Hunter Robin	Adult Swim	2004
February 27	Duel Masters	Cartoon Network	2004–2006
March 4	Tripping the Rift	Syfy	2004–2005
March 10	Game Over	UPN	2004
April 3	Danny Phantom	Nickelodeon	2004–2007
April 12	Peep and the Big Wide World	Discovery Kids	2004–2007
April 24	Wolf's Rain	Adult Swim	2004
April 28	Shorties Watchin' Shorties	Comedy Central	2004
May 1	Megas XLR	Cartoon Network	2004–2005
May 31	Peppa Pig	Nick Jr.	2004–2018
June 20	Fatherhood	Nick at Nite	2004–2005
July 1	Salad Fingers	Newgrounds	2004–2019 & 2022
July 30	O'Grady	The N	2004–2006
July 31	Justice League Unlimited	Cartoon Network	2004–2006
August 1	Stroker & Hoop	Adult Swim	2004–2005
August 13	Foster's Home for Imaginary Friends	Cartoon Network	2004–2009
August 21	Brandy & Mr. Whiskers	Disney Channel	2004–2006
August 31	Father of the Pride	NBC	2004–2005
September 6	Atomic Betty	Teletoon	2004–2008
September 7	Miss Spider's Sunny Patch Friends	Nickelodeon	2004–2008
September 11	The Batman	Kids' WB	2004–2008
September 11	Da Boom Crew	Kids' WB	2004–2005
September 11	Pokémon: Advanced Challenge	Kids' WB	2004–2005
September 13	Higglytown Heroes	Playhouse Disney	2004–2008
September 16	Video Mods	MTV	2004–2005
September 18	F-Zero: GP Legend	Fox Box	2004–2005
September 18	One Piece (Note: American release of the anime.)	Fox Box, Cartoon Network, Adult Swim, TVoD	2004–2009; 2013–2017; 2020–present (Note: Episodes 168 through 195 did not air on television in the United States, but did air in Australia. Episodes 196 to 206 also due not air. These episodes were, however, released on DVD. Episodes 385 onwards also did not air due to low ratings for the previous episodes. However, they were released on DVD as mentioned earlier. Beginning with episode 579 in 2020, Funimation decided to release the every episode on TVoD services.)
September 18	Super Robot Monkey Team Hyperforce Go!	Jetix	2004–2006
October 11	The Backyardigans	Nickelodeon	2004–2013
October 11	Maya & Miguel	PBS Kids	2004–2007
October 11	Postcards from Buster	PBS Kids	2004–2012
October 24	Nicktoons Film Festival	Nicktoons	2004–2009
October 27	Drawn Together	Comedy Central	2004–2007
November 5	Cartoon Alley	Turner Classic Movies	2004–2007
November 6	Fullmetal Alchemist	Adult Swim	2004–2009
November 6	Ghost in the Shell: Stand Alone Complex	Adult Swim	2004–2006
November 7	Perfect Hair Forever	Adult Swim	2004–2007
November 7	The Super Milk Chan Show	Adult Swim	2004–2005
November 7	6teen	Cartoon Network	2004–2010
November 8	ToddWorld	Discovery Kids	2004–2008
November 14	Tom Goes to the Mayor	Adult Swim	2004–2006
November 19	Hi Hi Puffy AmiYumi	Cartoon Network	2004–2006
December 18	W.I.T.C.H.	ABC Family	2004–2006
Unknown	This Just In!	Spike TV	2004

== Television series endings ==
Date	Title	Channel	Year	Notes
January 16	He-Man and the Masters of the Universe	Cartoon Network	2002–2004	Cancelled
January 23	Fillmore!	Toon Disney	2002–2004	Cancelled
January 24	Cubix: Robots for Everyone	Kids' WB	2001–2004	Ended
February 6	Little Bill	Nick Jr.	1999–2004	Ended
February 27	Lloyd in Space	Toon Disney	2001–2004	Ended
February 29	The Weekenders	Toon Disney	2000–2004	Ended
April 1	Stripperella	Spike TV	2003–2004	Cancelled
April 2	Game Over	UPN	2004	Cancelled
April 4	Home Movies	Adult Swim	1999–2004	Ended
April 12	Space Ghost Coast to Coast	Adult Swim	2001–2004	Cancelled, until revived by GameTap in 2006.
April 28	Rolie Polie Olie	Playhouse Disney	1998–2004	Ended
May 22	Static Shock	Kids' WB	2000–2004	Ended
May 29	Justice League	Cartoon Network	2001–2004	Ended
June 7	Whoopi's Littleburg	Nickelodeon	2004	Cancelled
June 8	Hey Arnold!	Nickelodeon	1996–2004	Ended
June 11	The Wild Thornberrys	Nickelodeon	1998–2004	Ended
June 25	VH1 ILL-ustrated	VH1	2003–2004	Cancelled
June 28	D'Myna Leagues	YTV, CITV	2000–2004	Cancelled
July 5	Ozzy & Drix	Kids' WB	2002–2004	Cancelled
July 30	Rocket Power	Nickelodeon	1999–2004	Ended
August 1	Rugrats	Nickelodeon	1991–1994, 1996–2004	Ended
August 17	Teamo Supremo	Toon Disney	2002–2004	Ended
August 27	Johnny Bravo	Cartoon Network	1997–2004	Ended
September 1	Braceface	Fox Family	2001– 2004	Ended
September 4	Pokémon: Advanced	Kids' WB	2003–2004	Ended
September 25	Samurai Jack	Cartoon Network	2001–2004	Cancelled, until revived by Adult Swim in 2017.
October 11	SpongeBob SquarePants	Nickelodeon	1999–2004, 2005-present	Ended, until revived by Nickelodeon in 2005.
October 22	Evil Con Carne	Cartoon Network	2003–2004	Ended
November 26	Stanley	Playhouse Disney	2001–2004	Ended
December 16	Shorties Watchin' Shorties	Comedy Central	2004	Ended
Unknown	This Just In!	Spike TV	2004	Ended

== Television season premieres ==
Date	Title	Season	Channel
January 10	Teen Titans	2	Cartoon Network
March 17	South Park	8	Comedy Central
April 16	The Powerpuff Girls	6	Cartoon Network
April 25	Aqua Teen Hunger Force	3	Adult Swim (Cartoon Network)
June 11	Codename: Kids Next Door	3	Cartoon Network
June 11	The Grim Adventures of Billy & Mandy	2	Cartoon Network
July 2	The Fairly OddParents	5	Nickelodeon
August 28	Teen Titans	3	Cartoon Network
September 24	Dora the Explorer	4	Nickelodeon
September 25	Kim Possible	3	Disney Channel
October 1	Evil Con Carne	2	Cartoon Network
October 1	The Grim Adventures of Billy & Mandy	3	Cartoon Network
November 5	Lilo & Stitch: The Series	2	Disney Channel
November 7	King of the Hill	9	Fox
November 7	The Simpsons	16	Fox
November 11	The Adventures of Jimmy Neutron, Boy Genius	3	Nickelodeon
November 19	Codename: Kids Next Door	4	Cartoon Network
December 8	My Life as a Teenage Robot	2	Nickelodeon

== Television season finales ==
Date	Title	Season	Channel
February 27	My Life as a Teenage Robot	1	Nickelodeon
February 28	Lilo & Stitch: The Series	1	Disney Channel
May 23	King of the Hill	8	Fox
May 23	The Simpsons	15	Fox
June 4	Codename: Kids Next Door	2	Cartoon Network
June 14	Dora the Explorer	3	Nickelodeon
July 9	The Adventures of Jimmy Neutron, Boy Genius	2	Nickelodeon
July 30	The Grim Adventures of Billy & Mandy	2	Cartoon Network
August 5	Kim Possible	2	Disney Channel
August 21	Teen Titans	2	Cartoon Network
October 11	SpongeBob SquarePants	3	Nickelodeon
October 22	Foster's Home for Imaginary Friends	1	Cartoon Network
October 24	Aqua Teen Hunger Force	3	Adult Swim (Cartoon Network)
November 5	Ed, Edd n Eddy	4	Cartoon Network
November 12	Codename: Kids Next Door	3	Cartoon Network
December 15	Drawn Together	1	Comedy Central
December 15	South Park	8	Comedy Central

== Video games based on animated films, series, etc. ==
Initial Release Date	Title	Platforms	Publisher	Developer
March 2	Scooby-Doo! Mystery Mayhem	PlayStation 2, GameCube, Xbox	THQ	Artificial Mind and Movement
March 23	Samurai Jack: The Shadow of Aku	PlayStation 2, GameCube	Sega	Adrenium Games
March 31	Disney presents Home on the Range	Game Boy Advance	Disney Interactive	Artificial Mind and Movement
May 4	Shrek 2	PlayStation 2, GameCube, Xbox, Game Boy Advance, Microsoft Windows, Mac OS X, Mobile	Activision	Luxoflux (Console); Vicarious Visions (GBA); KnowWonder (Windows); Aspyr (OS X)
August 3	Cartoon Network: Block Party	Game Boy Advance	Majesco	Monkeystone Games, One Man Band LLC
September 8	Finding Nemo: The Continuing Adventures	Game Boy Advance	THQ	Altron
September 9	The Fairly OddParents: Shadow Showdown	PlayStation 2, GameCube, Microsoft Windows, Game Boy Advance	THQ	Blitz Games; ImaginEngine (Windows); Helixe (GBA)
September 14	The Adventures of Jimmy Neutron Boy Genius: Attack of the Twonkies	PlayStation 2, GameCube, Game Boy Advance	THQ	THQ Studio Australia; Tantalus (GBA)
September 15	Kim Possible 2: Drakken's Demise	Game Boy Advance	Disney Interactive	Artificial Mind and Movement
September 21	Shark Tale	PlayStation 2, GameCube, Xbox, Game Boy Advance, Microsoft Windows	Activision	Edge of Reality; Vicarious Visions (GBA); KnowWonder (Windows)
September 27	Nicktoons: Freeze Frame Frenzy (Note: Named "SpongeBob SquarePants and Friends in Freeze Frame Frenzy" in PAL regions.)	Game Boy Advance	THQ	Altron
October 21	The Nightmare Before Christmas: Oogie's Revenge (Note: Initially titled "The Nightmare Before Christmas: Boogie's Revenge" in Japan.)	PlayStation 2	JP/EU: Capcom; NA: Buena Vista Games	Capcom Production Studio 3
October 22	Nicktoons Movin' (Note: Named "SpongeBob SquarePants Movin' with Friends" in PAL regions.)	PlayStation 2	THQ	Mass Media
October 27	Shrek 2: Beg for Mercy	Game Boy Advance	Activision	Vicarious Visions
October 27	The SpongeBob SquarePants Movie	PlayStation 2, GameCube, Xbox, Game Boy Advance, Microsoft Windows, Mac OS X Mobile	THQ	Heavy Iron Studios; WayForward Technologies (GBA); AWE Games (Windows)
November 1	The Incredibles	PlayStation 2, GameCube, Xbox, Game Boy Advance, Microsoft Windows, Mac OS X	THQ; Aspyr (OS X)	Heavy Iron Studios; Beenox (PC); Helixe (GBA)
November 2	Codename: Kids Next Door – Operation: S.O.D.A.	Game Boy Advance	Global Star Software	Vicarious Visions
November 2	The Polar Express	PlayStation 2, GameCube, Game Boy Advance, Microsoft Windows	THQ	Blue Tongue Entertainment; Tantalus (GBA)
November 3	Shrek 2: Team Action (Note: PC port of the console version of "Shrek 2".)	Microsoft Windows	Activision	Beenox
November 3	The Incredibles: When Danger Calls	Microsoft Windows, Mac OS X	THQ	Heavy Iron Studios
November 11	Kingdom Hearts: Chain of Memories	Game Boy Advance	WW: Square Enix JP: Nintendo	Square Enix, Jupiter
November 29	Dora the Explorer: Super Star Adventures	Game Boy Advance	Global Star Software	ImaginEngine

== Births ==
=== January ===
- January 7: Sofia Wylie, American actress (voice of Riri Williams / Ironheart in Marvel Rising and Spider-Man).
- January 10: Kaitlyn Maher, American actress (voice of Ella in A Turtle's Tale 2: Sammy's Escape from Paradise, The President's Daughter in Free Birds).
- January 28: Zaris-Angel Hator, English actress (voice of Maisie Brumble in The Sea Beast).

=== March ===
- March 1: Izabella Alvarez, American actress (voice of Ronnie Anne Santiago in The Loud House and The Casagrandes).
- March 8: Kit Connor, English actor (voice of Brightbill in The Wild Robot).

=== May ===
- May 1: Charli D'Amelio, American social media personality and dancer (voice of Tinker in StarDog and TurboCat, herself in The Simpsons episode "Meat Is Murder").
- May 13: Ava Acres, American actress (voice of Erik in Happy Feet Two, Sayaka in When Marnie Was There, Zan in the Kung Fu Panda: Legends of Awesomeness episode "Kung Fu Day Care").
- May 22: Peyton Elizabeth Lee, American actress (voice of Rani in The Lion Guard).

=== June ===
- June 8: Francesca Capaldi, American actress (voice of the Little Red-Haired Girl and Frieda in The Peanuts Movie, Snowpaws in Whisker Haven).

=== July ===
- July 15: Hayden Rolence, American actor (voice of Nemo in Finding Dory).
- July 17: Shamon Brown Jr., American actor (voice of Michelangelo in Teenage Mutant Ninja Turtles: Mutant Mayhem).

=== August ===
- August 4: Noah Bentley, American actor (voice of Burple in Dragons: Rescue Riders, Mo in Elliott from Earth, Buff (Bat Truck) in Batwheels).
- August 5:
  - Albert Tsai, American actor (voice of Kid in The Mr. Peabody & Sherman Show, Peng in Abominable, Drew in Diary of a Wimpy Kid: Rodrick Rules).
  - Honor Kneafsey, British actress (voice of Robyn Goodfellowe in Wolfwalkers).
- August 14: Marsai Martin, American actress and producer (voice of Prudence Granger in Spirit Untamed, Liberty in PAW Patrol: The Movie and PAW Patrol: The Mighty Movie, Aggro in DreamWorks Dragons: Rescue Riders, Jill in Goldie & Bear, Caterina in Elena of Avalor).

=== September ===
- September 23: Anthony Gonzalez, American actor (voice of Miguel Rivera in Coco).

=== October ===
- October 3: Noah Schnapp, Canadian-American actor (voice of Charlie Brown in The Peanuts Movie, Kai in The Legend of Hallowaiian, Jay in The Angry Birds Movie).

=== November ===
- November 17: Andre Robinson, American actor (voice of Donny McStuffins in Doc McStuffins, Meerkat Baby in Khumba, Niko in Niko and the Sword of Light, Clyde McBride in seasons 3-5 of The Loud House and The Loud House Movie, young Bilal in Bilal: A New Breed of Hero, Oliver in Summer Camp Island, Cutter in Dragons: Rescue Riders, Hansel in A Tale Dark & Grimm, Brandon in the American Dad! episode "Mused and Abused").
- November 27: Jet Jurgensmeyer, American actor (voice of Gabriel, Aiden and Rudy in Special Agent Oso, Nonny in seasons 3–4 of Bubble Guppies, Kaz and Zac in Shimmer and Shine, Orby and Dudley in Puppy Dog Pals, Dirty in The Stinky & Dirty Show, Stinky in Hey Arnold!: The Jungle Movie, young Guapo in Ferdinand, Junior in Next Gen, Pip in T.O.T.S., Cornelius in The Chicken Squad episode "House Guest").

=== December ===
- December 18: Isabella Crovetti, American actress and voice actress (voice of Shine in Shimmer and Shine, Ash in Whisker Haven, Vampirina "Vee" Hauntley in Vampirina, Zsa Zsa in SuperKitties).

== Deaths ==
=== January ===
- January 1: Yevgeniy Migunov, Russian film director, caricaturist, illustrator, and animator (Karandash and Klyaska - Merry Hunters, Familiar Pictures), dies at age 82.
- January 8: Eddy Ryssack, Belgian comics artist and animator (Belvision), dies from a heart attack at age 75.
- January 10: Sidney Miller, American actor (voice of The Dungeon Master in Dungeons & Dragons, Hornswoggle in The Gary Coleman Show, Horrg in Monchhichis, Oompe in Little Nemo: Adventures in Slumberland), dies at age 87.

=== February ===
- February 1: James Simpkins, Canadian animator and comics artist (National Film Board of Canada), dies at age 93.
- February 3: Jason Raize, American actor and singer (voice of Denahi in Brother Bear), commits suicide at age 28.
- February 5: John Hench, American animator, designer and creative director (Walt Disney Company), dies at age 95.
- February 11: Tony Pope, American actor (voice of the Big Bad Wolf in Who Framed Roger Rabbit, Geppetto in House of Mouse, Wreck-Gar in The Transformers, Junior in What a Cartoon!, Scientist in the Superman: The Animated Series episode "New Kids in Town", continued voice of Goofy), dies at age 56.
- February 12: Anthony Rizzo, Italian-American film director (Duck and Cover), dies at age 85.

=== March ===
- March 1: Barbara Frawley, Australian actress (voice of Dot in Dot and the Kangaroo and its sequels), dies at age 68.
- March 6: Peggy DeCastro, American singer (Bird and Animal voices in Song of the South), dies at age 83.
- March 7: Paul Winfield, American actor (voice of Mr. Smith in The Wish That Changed Christmas, Jeffrey Robbins in Gargoyles, Mr. Ruhle in The Magic School Bus, Omar Mosley/Black Marvel in Spider-Man, Sam Young in Batman Beyond, Lucious Sweet in The Simpsons, Earl Cooper in the Batman: The Animated Series episode "The Mechanic", Father in the Happily Ever After: Fairy Tales for Every Child episode "Beauty and the Beast"), dies from a heart attack at age 64.
- March 8: Robin Klein, American casting director (Foodfight!), dies at age 43.
- March 12: William Moritz, American animation film historian, dies at age 62.
- March 14: René Laloux, French animator and film director (Les Escargots, La Planète Sauvage, Les Maîtres du temps), dies at age 74 from a heart attack.
- March 28: Peter Ustinov, English actor (voice of Prince John and King Richard in Robin Hood, and the title character in Dr. Snuggles), dies at age 82.
- Specific date unknown: John Grace, English television writer (64 Zoo Lane, Pablo the Little Red Fox, Kipper, Ethelbert the Tiger, co-creator of ReBoot), dies at an unknown age.

=== April ===
- April 1: Sándor Reisenbüchler, Hungarian film director, animator and graphic artist, dies at age 69.
- April 14:
  - Micheline Charest, English-born Canadian television producer (co-founder of CINAR), dies from complications from plastic surgery at age 51.
  - Harry Holt, American comics artist and animator (Walt Disney Animation Studios, Hanna-Barbera), dies at age 93.
- April 15: Mitsuteru Yokoyama, Japanese manga artist (Tetsujin 28-go), dies at age 69 from burns suffered in a fire.
- April 25: Jacques Rouxel, French animator (Les Shadoks), dies at age 73.

=== May ===
- May 3: Volus Jones, American animator (Warner Bros. Cartoons, Walter Lantz, Format Films, Hanna-Barbera, Famous Studios, UPA, Ralph Bakshi), dies at age 90.
- May 7: Diana Chesney, British-American actress (voice of Mrs. Judson in The Great Mouse Detective), dies at age 87.
- May 9: Robert Naylor, American animator and comics artist, dies at age 94.
- May 15: Jack Bradbury, American animator and comics artist (Walt Disney Company, Warner Bros. Cartoons), dies at age 89.

=== June ===
- June 10: Ray Charles, American singer, songwriter and pianist (voice of G-Clef in Blue's Big Musical Movie), dies from liver failure at age 73.
- June 13: Danny Dark, American voice actor (voice of Superman in Super Friends, announcer for StarKist and Raid), dies from a pulmonary hemorrhage at age 65.
- June 17: Todor Dinov, Bulgarian animator and comics artist, dies at age 84.

=== July ===
- July 7: Vlado Kristl, Yugoslavian-Croatian film director and animator (Don Kihot), dies at age 81.
- July 9: Isabel Sanford, American actress and comedian (voice of Betsy in the Wait Till Your Father Gets Home episode "Help Wanted", Shirley McLoon in the A Pup Named Scooby-Doo episode "A Bicycle Built for Boo!", Bernice in the Pepper Ann episode "Cocoon Gables", herself in The Simpsons episode "Milhouse Doesn't Live Here Anymore"), dies at age 86.
- July 16: Andy Engman, Swedish-Finnish-American animator (Walt Disney Company), dies at age 92.
- July 21: Jerry Goldsmith, American composer and conductor (The Secret of NIMH, Mulan, Looney Tunes: Back in Action), dies at age 75.
- July 26: Oğuz Aral, Turkish comics artist, animator, and film director and producer (Koca Yusuf (Yusuf the Wrestler), Direkler Arası (Theater), Bu Şehr-i İstanbul (This City Called Istanbul), Ağustos Böceği ile Karınca (The Cricket and the Ant) ), dies at age 68.
- July 28:
  - Jackson Beck, American actor (voice of Perry White in The New Adventures of Superman, the fox in Baby Huey cartoons, the father in Little Lulu, Buzzy the Crow in Herman and Katnip, Brutus the Cat in Race For Your Life, Charlie Brown, continued voice of Bluto, narrator in G.I. Joe: A Real American Hero), dies at age 92.
  - Sam Edwards, American actor (voice of adult Thumper in Bambi, and the title character in Rod Rocket), dies at age 89.

=== August ===
- August 13: Peter Woodthorpe, English actor (voice of Gollum in The Lord of the Rings, Werewolf in The Talking Parcel, Casca in the Shakespeare: The Animated Tales episode "Julius Caesar"), dies at age 72.
- August 18: Elmer Bernstein, American composer and conductor (Heavy Metal, The Black Cauldron), dies at age 82.

=== September ===
- September 8: Frank Thomas, American animator and pianist (Walt Disney Animation Studios), dies at age 92.
- September 15: Johnny Ramone, American musician and member of the Ramones (voiced himself in The Simpsons episode "Rosebud"), dies from prostate cancer at age 55.

=== October ===
- October 5: Rodney Dangerfield, American comedian (writer, producer, and voice of the title character in Rover Dangerfield, Rat-A-Tat-Tat in The Electric Piper, Larry Burns in The Simpsons episode "Burns, Baby Burns", himself in the Dr. Katz, Professional Therapist episode "Day Planner"), dies at age 82.
- October 10: Christopher Reeve, American actor (voice of Clark Kent in a AT&T commercial, It Zwibble in the HBO Storybook Musicals episode "Earthday Birthday"), director (Everyone's Hero), and activist, dies at age 52.
- October 25: John Peel, English disc jockey, radio presenter, record producer and journalist (voice of Announcer in the Space Ghost Coast to Coast episode "Explode"), dies from a heart attack at age 65.

=== November ===
- November 9: Ed Kemmer, American actor (model for Prince Phillip in Sleeping Beauty), dies at age 83.
- November 11:
  - Dayton Allen, American comedian and actor (voice of Deputy Dawg), dies at age 85.
  - Zvonimir Lončarić, Croatian animator, sculptor and painter (art director on Surogat), dies at age 77.
- November 12: Harry Hargreaves, English comics artist, illustrator and animator (Gaumont British, GoGo the Fox), dies at age 82.
- November 30: Carmen D'Avino, American painter, sculptor and film director, dies at age 86.

=== December ===
- December 8: Dimebag Darrell, American musician and member of Pantera (composed the track "Prehibernation" which was used in the SpongeBob SquarePants episode "Prehibernation Week", and "Walk" which was used in Sonic the Hedgehog 2), was murdered at age 38.
- December 15: Alma Duncan, Canadian painter, graphic artist and film director ( Kumak the Sleepy Hunter, Hearts and Soles), dies at age 86.
- December 22: Ben van Voorn, Dutch comics artist and animator (worked for Marten Toonder's animation department and on the films Asterix Versus Caesar and Asterix and the Big Fight), dies at age 67.
- December 28: Jerry Orbach, American actor (voice of Lumière in Beauty and the Beast), dies at age 69.

== See also ==
- 2004 in anime
