= Girl on the Edge =

2015 American drama film

- Film poster
- Directed by: Jay Silverman
- Screenplay by: Joey Curtis
- Story by: Jay Silverman; Joey Curtis; Joseph Gamache
- Produced by: Keefe Kaupanger-Swacker; Will Newman
- Starring: Taylor Spreitler; Gil Bellows; Elizabeth Peña; Peter Coyote
- Cinematography: Andrew Russo
- Edited by: Lauren Connelly
- Music by: Dave Holden
- Production company: Jay Silverman Productions
- Distributed by: 4Digital Media
- Release date: February 23, 2015 (Sedona)
- Running time: 100 minutes
- Country: United States
- Language: English

Girl on the Edge is a 2015 American drama film directed by Jay Silverman and starring Taylor Spreitler, Gil Bellows, Elizabeth Peña (in one of her final posthumous film roles; she died four months before this film’s premiere) and Peter Coyote. The film premiered at the 2015 Sedona Film Festival.

== Premise ==
A troubled teenager falls victim to an online predator. Unable to cope with her psychological trauma, Hannah Green (Taylor Spreitler) becomes self-destructive and her parents make the heartbreaking decision to send her away to an alternative healing center in the wilderness.

== Cast ==
- Taylor Spreitler as Hannah Green
- Peter Coyote as Hank Taylor
- Gil Bellows as Jake Green
- Amy Price-Francis as Anne Green
- Shane Graham as Tommy Miller
- Elizabeth Peña as Esther
- Amy Davidson as Ariel
- Rex Lee as Travis Lee
- Mackenzie Phillips as Deborah Green
- Carla Jeffery as Crystal

== Production ==
Gil Bellows explained that he was attracted to the project and said "I have two kids. Telling stories that can create conversations between parents and their children about crucial issues and at the same time hold on to the most important part of any story’s responsibility; to entertain its audience is important to me."

Bellows also explained that he worked on the script with director Jay Sivelman "Jay was very collaborative in the development stage and embraced the give and take of my ideas and input." On his role, Bellows added that the hardest part was "playing a loving, caring parent who doesn’t have all the answers and is suffering along with his daughter was challenging, but is also what drew me to be in this film."

== Reception ==
Radio Times awarded the film three stars out of five.

In his HuffPost review, Lloyd I. Sederer praises Girl on the Edge for its sensitive portrayal of trauma and recovery, emphasizing the film’s ability to offer hope to struggling families. He highlights the universal principles of healing—trust, perseverance, and a supportive community—while acknowledging that financial privilege can make treatment more accessible. However, he argues that the film’s message extends beyond wealth, illustrating the essential elements needed for recovery from mental health and addiction challenges. As Sederer concludes, "We see that portrayed with care in Girl on the Edge. That's a message so many families need to see, and this film offers them a story to believe in."
