= Taylor Spreitler =

American actress (born 1993)

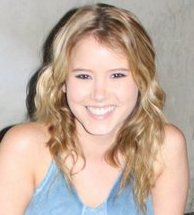
- Spreitler attending the Miss Behave Hollywood premiere (2010)
- Born: October 23, 1993 (age 33); Hattiesburg, Mississippi, U.S.
- Occupation: Actress
- Years active: 2004–present

Taylor Spreitler (born October 23, 1993) is an American actress. She is best known for her roles as Mia McCormick in the soap opera series Days of Our Lives (2009–2010), Lennox Scanlon in the sitcom Melissa & Joey (2010–2015) and Kendra Gable in the sitcom Kevin Can Wait (2016–2018). Her films include the comedy 3 Day Test (2012), the action thriller The Contractor (2013) and the horror films Amityville: The Awakening (2017) and Leprechaun Returns (2018).

== Biography ==
=== Early life ===
Spreitler was born on October 23, 1993, in Hattiesburg, Mississippi, the daughter of Danny and Denise Spreitler. She spent her younger years in Wiggins, Mississippi, and moved with her mother to Los Angeles when she was 11. Spreitler was home-schooled.

=== Career ===
Beginning her career as a model, Spreitler's first commercial audition was for a national campaign for Motrin. This was followed by a series of spots, including those for Jif, Hess, and Chuck E. Cheese. In 2009, Spreitler signed a three-year contract to play the role of Mia McCormick on the NBC daytime soap opera Days of Our Lives. In 2011, she was nominated for Best Performance in a Daytime TV Series by a Young Actress at the 32nd Young Artist Awards.

Spreitler starred as Lennox Scanlon, the niece of Melissa Joan Hart's character, in ABC Family's Melissa & Joey. In 2016, she was cast as Kendra Gable, the daughter of Kevin James' character, in the CBS sitcom Kevin Can Wait.

Spreitler co-starred with Bella Thorne and Thomas Mann in the 2017 horror film Amityville: The Awakening. She also starred in the 2018 horror comedy film Leprechaun Returns.

== Filmography ==
Film
Year	Title	Role	Notes
2007	All Souls Day	Alice	Short film
2012	3 Day Test	Lu Taylor	
2013	The Contractor	McKenzie Chase	
2015	Girl on the Edge	Hannah Green	
2017	Amityville: The Awakening	Marissa	
2018	Leprechaun Returns	Lila Jenkins	Direct-to-video

Television
Year	Title	Role	Notes
2005	Law & Order: Special Victims Unit	Chloe Sellers	Episode: "Pure"
2009–2010	Days of Our Lives	Mia McCormick	139 episodes
2010–2015	Melissa & Joey	Lennox Scanlon	104 episodes
2012	Stalked at 17	Angela Curson	Television film
2012	Never Fade Away	Trish Cavanaugh	4 episodes
2012	Law & Order: Special Victims Unit	Taylor Culphers	Episode: "Friending Emily"
2014	Category 5	Young Victoria	Television film
2015	Bones	Courtney Hodsoll	Episode: "The Woman in the Whirlpool"
2015	Criminal Minds	Riley Desario	Episode: "Pariahville"
2015	Casual	Mia	6 episodes
2016–2018	Kevin Can Wait	Kendra Gable	48 episodes
2020	Driven to the Edge	Tess	Television film
2020–2023	Young Sheldon	Sam	4 episodes
