= Max 2: White House Hero =

- Theatrical release poster
- Directed by: Brian Levant
- Written by: Steve Altiere
- Based on: Characters by Boaz Yakin; Sheldon Lettich
- Produced by: Brian Levant; Matt Bierman
- Starring: Zane Austin; Francesca Capaldi; Lochlyn Munro; Andrew Kavadas
- Cinematography: Jan Kiesser
- Edited by: Tony Lombardo
- Music by: Randy Edelman
- Production companies: Orion Pictures; Sunswept Entertainment
- Distributed by: Orion Pictures; Metro-Goldwyn-Mayer; Warner Bros. Pictures
- Release date: May 5, 2017
- Running time: 85 minutes
- Country: United States
- Language: English

Max 2: White House Hero is a 2017 American adventure film produced by Warner Bros. and Sunswept Entertainment. The film was released by Orion Pictures and Warner Bros. Pictures on May 5, 2017. It is a sequel to the 2015 film Max. The movie was filmed on location in and around Vancouver, British Columbia. Principal photography on the film began in June 2016 and wrapped on July 13, 2016.

== The main plot ==
Max is assigned to the White House while Charlie, the Secret Service dog, is on maternity leave. He meets Thomas Bennett Jr. (T.J.), a 12-year-old boy, who is the son of President Thomas Bennett Sr. Due to his father's high profile, he is trying hard to fit in and lead a normal life. During a state visit by the Russian prime minister and his daughter, Alexandra (Alex), T.J. is asked to accompany her, during their stay. T.J. befriends Alex, but when they sneak out of the White House in an attempt to find a party thrown by some of his new friends at school, two masked villains try to kidnap T.J. and Alex.

Luckily for the kids, Max has also managed to sneak out of the White House, following T.J. and Alex, and jumps in to save T.J. Max bites the ankle of one of the bandits and Alex and T.J. are able to escape the kidnappers' clutches and run back to the White House, where they promptly get in hot water with their parents and the White House security detail. T.J. and Alex form an unlikely alliance and start investigating the nefarious doings of all they suspect. As their many attempts at sleuthing backfire and a harrowing attempt at harming the First Lady is narrowly foiled by Max, the Secret Service finally persuades Thomas Sr. to relieve Max of his duties.

After that incident, the Russian president declares to President Bennett, "If you cannot protect your children, how are you going to protect our children?" and decides to return to Moscow, cutting his visit short. T.J., who is despondent, cannot sleep and while searching for an early morning snack in the kitchen discovers that Chef Coop is the Russian mole. Coop locks him in the freezer and escapes. Meanwhile, Olga tricks Alex into following her into woods, so that Coop can abduct her.

Max finally escapes from his cage and smashes back into the residence to save T.J., alerting everyone to the misdeeds at hand. After a heroic pursuit of the criminals by Max and T.J. with both Presidents and Agent Thorn, the perpetrators are captured and Alex is rescued. Thomas Sr. apologizes to his son for not listening to him and assures him that the First Family is a family first. T.J. and Alex convince their fathers to resume their talks where a historic agreement is reached and an award for bravery is bestowed upon Max. In the end, T.J. kisses Alex thanks to Max nudging T.J., and he gets a surprise; Charlie had three puppies and T.J., wants to keep them all and starts playing with them.

== The cast of Max 2: White House hero ==
- Zane Austin as Thomas Bennett Jr. (T.J.)
- Francesca Capaldi as Alexandra "Alex" Bragov
- Lochlyn Munro as President Thomas Bennett Sr.
- Andrew Kavadas as President Vladimir Bragov
- Reese Alexander as Secret Service Agent Thorn
- Carrie Genzel as First Lady Maureen Bennett
- Bradley Stryker as Chef Coop
- Kathryn Kirkpatrick as FSB Agent Olga
- Bruce Blain as Russian Chef
- Jessica Roch as White House Chef
- Curtis Lum as Agent Nelson
- Lucia Walters as Tour Guide
- Gabriel LaBelle as Alfred
- Garry Chalk as Colonel Jones
- Carlos, Jagger and Dude as Max

== Reception ==
On Forbes, Luke Y. Thompson wrote that, "it's for kids. Yeah, they can do better, but they can also do a lot worse." In his review for Common Sense Media, Renee Schonfeld rated it 2/5 stars, and wrote, "forgettable tale with cute kids, gallant dog; some violence."

== Home media ==
The film was released on Blu-ray on May 23, 2017 by Warner Bros. Home Entertainment. It is the first Orion Pictures film to be distributed by Warner Bros. in home media since Zelig.
