= Amityville: The Awakening =

2017 film by Franck Khalfoun

- Theatrical release poster with original release date
- Directed by: Franck Khalfoun
- Written by: Franck Khalfoun
- Produced by: Jason Blum; Daniel Farrands; Casey La Scala
- Starring: Jennifer Jason Leigh; Bella Thorne; Cameron Monaghan; Thomas Mann; Jennifer Morrison; Kurtwood Smith
- Cinematography: Steven Poster
- Edited by: Patrick McMahon
- Music by: Robin Coudert
- Production companies: Dimension Films; Blumhouse Productions; Panic Ventures; Baron Films
- Distributed by: RADiUS-TWC
- Release date: October 28, 2017 (United States)
- Running time: 87 minutes
- Country: United States
- Language: English
- Box office: $8.4 million

Amityville: The Awakening is a 2017 American supernatural horror film written and directed by Franck Khalfoun and starring Bella Thorne, Jennifer Jason Leigh, Cameron Monaghan, Mckenna Grace, Thomas Mann, Taylor Spreitler, Jennifer Morrison, and Kurtwood Smith. It is the tenth installment of the Amityville film series and a metafilm taking place in the "real world", where the 1979 original, its sequels, and the 2005 remake are all works of fiction. Its plot follows teenager Belle Walker who moves into 112 Ocean Avenue with her family, who shortly find themselves haunted by a demonic entity using her brain-dead twin brother James' body as a vessel.

Originally titled Amityville: The Lost Tapes, it was announced in May 2011, and was initially conceived as a found footage-style film and a separate entry in the franchise. However, the studio abandoned the film's original idea, and hired Khalfoun to write and direct a new draft in early-2012. Filmed in 2014, the film suffered numerous release delays before finally being released for free on Google Play on October 12, 2017 and on DVD in 2018.

Amityville: The Awakening was theatrically released by Dimension Films in a limited release on October 28, 2017. The film had grossed $8.4 million worldwide and received mixed-to-negative reviews from critics, with criticism for its generic writing, horror clichés and reliance on jump scares. It is the last film to be released by distributor RADiUS-TWC, as the company shut down along with Dimension and their parent company, The Weinstein Company, on July 16, 2018, following the sexual abuse allegations against its co-founder Harvey Weinstein.

== Plot ==
Teenager Belle Walker moves to 112 Ocean Avenue in Amityville, Long Island with her mother Joan, younger sister Juliet, brain-dead twin brother James, and dog Larry. The family's reason for moving there was to be closer to Dr. Ken Milton, a neurologist hoping to treat James, who is on life support after an accident that left him paralyzed. Upon moving in, Juliet tells Belle that James has been talking to her lately. That night, James flatlines, but is mysteriously revived and opens his eyes.

At school, Belle is taunted by her peers over moving into the home, which she learns was the site of a mass murder by Ronald DeFeo Jr. in 1974. In her third-floor bedroom, she discovers blood stains from the murder concealed under the wallpaper. One night, Belle invites acquaintances Terrence—an enthusiast on the Amityville haunting—and Marissa over to watch The Amityville Horror (1979) at the house. At 3:15 am in the middle of the film, the power goes out and the three go into the basement to locate the fuse box, where they are confronted by Joan, who thinks they are intruders.

Dr. Milton, who suspects James may have locked-in syndrome, performs an EEG test on James that shows increased neurological function. During the test, Dr. Milton witnesses an apparition of flies filling the room and attacking him, and leaves the house, shaken. James quickly gains the ability to communicate with the family via an AAC computer system that allows him to type by looking at letters on a screen. Terrence suggests to Belle that James' sudden revival may be a result of possession stemming from the house, and they suspect that a ring on the ground surrounding the house may represent a magic circle. Belle explains her troubled past to Marissa and reveals that James sustained his injuries after falling off a three-story balcony during a fight with a boy who had leaked nude pictures of Belle online. Belle asks James if someone else is inhabiting his body, to which he replies "Yes" and "Help" via his computer. He asks her to kill him, and she shuts off his ventilation machine. Joan enters the room and finds that James is now breathing on his own.

The next day, Belle types “Outside walk” on James’ computer in order to distract her mother and find the Red Room in the basement, which she believes to be the source of James’ power. Larry the dog is found mauled to death in the lake by Juliet, and Belle confronts her mother with the theory that the house is possessing James. Joan reveals to her that after having lost her faith in God following the death of her husband and James’ subsequent accident, she moved the family to the home, hoping to harness the demonic energy there in order to bring James back to life.

That night, as Belle prepares to leave, Joan knocks her unconscious. Belle awakens at 3:15 am, just as her aunt Candice arrives at the house. James rises from his bed, and harnesses the energy from the Red Room, which revitalizes his body. Belle makes her way downstairs as Candice enters the house, but James shoots Candice with a shotgun. Belle retrieves Juliet from her room, but the house locks the doors, preventing them from escaping. Joan is confronted by James in her bedroom and knowing she is facing death, she retrieves her crucifix, and holds it toward James, but he is unaffected. He reminds her that with the loss of her faith, God is not able to save her. James shoots Joan in the chest before throwing her on her bed and shooting her in the head. He lures Juliet to the third floor, where he attempts to kill her, but is stopped by Belle, who tackles him, resulting in them both falling from the window. Belle lands on top of James which incapacitates him. She drags James outside the circle, after which his body withers back to its paralyzed form, and he dies after thanking her for freeing him from the possession.

A newsreel epilogue reveals that Belle is being questioned for the murders of her mother, aunt, and brother. However, Juliet corroborates Belle's story that James was the murderer. James' fingerprints were discovered on the murder weapon, but Dr. Milton refutes the claim due to James’ paralysis. The news report comments on yet another tragedy occurring in the Amityville house.

== Cast ==
- Bella Thorne as Belle Walker
- Cameron Monaghan as James Walker
- Jennifer Jason Leigh as Joan Walker
- Mckenna Grace as Juliet Walker
- Thomas Mann as Terrence
- Taylor Spreitler as Marissa
- Jennifer Morrison as Candice
- Kurtwood Smith as Dr. Ken Milton
- Robin Atkin Downes as The Narrator (voice)

== Production ==
=== Development ===
The film was initially conceived as a separate film entitled Amityville: The Lost Tapes. Dimension Films and Blumhouse Productions were to co-produce the film together, with a screenplay by Casey La Scala and Daniel Farrands. It was to be a found-footage film in the style of La Scala and Blumhouse's highly successful Paranormal Activity films. The plot involved "an ambitious female television news intern, on the verge of breaking the most famous haunted house case in the world, who leads a team of journalists, clergymen and paranormal researchers into an investigation of the bizarre events that will come to be known as The Amityville Horror, only to unwittingly open a door to the unreal that she may never be able to close."

Franck Khalfoun was set to write and direct the film, and filming was to begin in the summer and be released by January 27, 2012. In a press release, Bob Weinstein stated, "We are thrilled to return to the mythology of The Amityville Horror with a new and terrifying vision that will satisfy our existing fans and also introduce an entirely new audience to this popular haunting phenomenon." After several delays, the film was rewritten with a completely new story and screenplay by Khalfoun. In March 2014, this new iteration was retitled Amityville.

=== Casting ===
That month, Jennifer Jason Leigh and Bella Thorne signed on to star. In April, Thomas Mann, Taylor Spreitler and Cameron Monaghan signed on to the film.

=== Filming ===
Principal photography began April 1, 2014 and concluded May 9 that year in Long Beach. A full house set was built for production in El Dorado Park. Further delays, including February 2016 reshoots, pushed the film's release to late 2016, and then early 2017.

== Release ==
The film was originally scheduled for release on January 2, 2015. However, in September 2014, it was removed from the schedule. In May 2015, it was announced the film would be released on April 15, 2016. When Filmyard Holdings sold Miramax to beIN Media Group on March 2, 2016, Miramax was no longer the production company of Amityville: The Awakening. It was set to be released on April 1, 2016, but was delayed due to test screening responses and given the release date of January 6, 2017. On December 16, 2016, just weeks away from the film's January 6 release date, the film was again pushed back, this time to June 30, 2017; it was eventually removed from there as well. In September 2017, it was announced that it would be released in select theaters in the US on October 28, 2017, and for free on Google Play from October 12 to November 8, 2017.

The film was released on DVD, Blu-ray and Digital HD on November 14, 2017.

== Reception ==
=== Box office ===
Despite the US delays, the film began its theatrical run in Ukraine and Central America on July 20, 2017, where the film grossed $580,466 from 830 screens. The film was released in the Philippines on August 2, 2017.

The film opened in the US on a limited release on October 28, 2017. Playing in 10 theaters the film made just $742 in its opening weekend (an average of $74 per venue), finishing 60th at the box office.

=== Critical response ===
On review aggregator Rotten Tomatoes, the film has an approval rating of 29% based on 21 reviews, and an average rating of 3.90/10. On Metacritic, which assigns a normalized rating to reviews, the film has a weighted average score of 42 out of 100, based on 4 critics, indicating "mixed or average" reviews.

Witney Siebold of IGN gave the film a score of 5.5/10, writing that the film, "while largely a generic haunting film without much in the way of a hook beyond its famous setting, can at least claim to be one of the more watchable Amityville films, for whatever that praise may be worth," and deemed it "perhaps the best Amityville film since 1983." Dread Central gave the film two and a half stars out of five saying "At the end of the day, this isn't such a bad flick, but viewers looking for an insane new Amityville experience will just have to keep chasing that dragon." Slant Magazine gave the film two out of four stars and called it "an elegant entry in a lame series of horror films."

=== Home media ===
The film was released on Blu-ray, DVD, and on demand on November 14, 2017, but was not released in the U.K.

== Prequel ==
An eleventh film called The Amityville Murders was released on February 8, 2019 from The Awakening producer Daniel Farrands, who wrote and directed the film.
