= 3 Day Test =

- Directed by: Corbin Bernsen
- Written by: Corbin Bernsen; Michael Winnick
- Produced by: Corbin Bernsen; Chris Aronoff
- Starring: George Newbern; Megyn Price; Corbin Bernsen; Taylor Spreitler; Francesca Capaldi; Aidan Potter
- Cinematography: Scott Williams
- Edited by: Ethan Holzman
- Music by: Brenton Costa
- Distributed by: Umbrella Entertainment
- Release date: November 6, 2012
- Running time: 93 minutes
- Country: United States
- Language: English

3 Day Test, also known as 3 Day Christmas, is a 2012 American comedy film directed and written by Corbin Bernsen and starring George Newbern, Megyn Price, and Bernsen. The film was released on November 6, 2012. The film was released in the UK as Home & Alone For Christmas.

== Premise ==
Family father Martin Taylor is out of touch with the members of his family. To better reconnect with them, he comes up with a plan that includes no use of technology, no electricity, and cut off from the outside. Not the winter vacation they were expecting, now the Taylors have to work together to show Dad they can endure his "3 Day Test".

== Cast ==
- George Newbern as Martin Taylor
- Megyn Price as Jackie Taylor
- Corbin Bernsen as Tom
- Taylor Spreitler as Lu Taylor
- Francesca Capaldi as Jessie Taylor
- Aidan Potter as Adam Taylor

== Production ==
3 Day Test was shot in Akron, Ohio.
