= 2004 in anime =

The events of 2004 in anime.

== Accolades ==
At the Mainichi Film Awards, The Place Promised in Our Early Days won the Animation Film Award and Mind Game won the Ōfuji Noburō Award. Internationally, Ghost in the Shell 2: Innocence was nominated for the Annie Award for Best Animated Feature, the fourth consecutive year an anime was nominated for the award. Howl's Moving Castle was in competition for the Golden Lion at the 61st Venice International Film Festival.

== Releases ==
This list contains numerous notable entries of anime which debuted in 2004. It is not a complete list and represents popular works that debuted as TV, OVA and Movie releases. Web content, DVD specials, TV specials are not on this list.

=== Films ===
A list of anime that debuted in theaters between January 1 and December 31, 2004.

Release date	Title	Studio	Director	Running Time (minutes)	Alternate Title	Notes	Ref.
January 16	Dead Leaves	Production I.G	Hiroyuki Imaishi	52	Deddo rībusu		
February 21	Nitaboh	WAO World	Akio Nishizawa	99	NITABOH		
March 6	Ghost in the Shell 2: Innocence	Production I.G	Mamoru Oshii	98	Inosensu	Co-production with Studio Ghibli. Nominated for the Annie Award for Best Animated Feature	
March 6	One Piece: The Cursed Holy Sword	Toei Company	Kazuhisa Takenōchi	95	Wan Pīsu: Norowareta Seiken		
April 17	Appleseed	Digital Frontier	Shinji Aramaki	103	Appurushīdo		
April 17	Crayon Shin-chan: Fierceness That Invites Storm! The Kasukabe Boys of the Evening Sun	Shin-Ei Animation	Tsutomu Mizushima	97	Eiga Kureyon shinchan arashi o yobu! Yūhi no kasukabe bōizu		
April 17	Detective Conan: Magician of the Silver Sky	TMS Entertainment	Yasuichiro Yamamoto	108	Meitantei konan: gin'yoku no majishan		
July 17	Steamboy	Sunrise	Katsuhiro Otomo	126	Suchīmubōi	Co-production with Bandai Visual	
August 7	Mind Game	Studio 4°C	Masaaki Yuasa	103	Maindo Gēmu	Won the Ōfuji Noburō Award	
August 13	Yu-Gi-Oh!: The Movie	Gallop	Hatsuki Tsuji	101	Yū ☆ gi ☆ Ō deyueru monsutāzu hikari no piramiddo		
August 21	Naruto the Movie: Ninja Clash in the Land of Snow	Pierrot	Tensai Okamura	82	Gekijō-ban Naruto: Daikatsugeki! Yukihime Ninpōchō Dattebayo!!		
November 20	Howl's Moving Castle	Studio Ghibli	Hayao Miyazaki	119	Hauru no Ugoku Shiro	Was in competition for the Golden Lion at the 61st Venice International Film Festival	
November 20	The Place Promised in Our Early Days	CoMix Wave Inc.	Makoto Shinkai	90	Kumo no Mukō, Yakusoku no Basho	Won the Animation Film Award at the Mainichi Film Awards	
December 4	Blade of the Phantom Master	OLM Digital	Jōji Shimura	85	Atarashī ankō sensā		
December 23	InuYasha The Movie 4: Fire on the Mystic Island	Sunrise	Toshiya Shinohara	87	Eiga Inuyasha: Guren no Hōraijima		

=== Television series ===
A list of anime television series that debuted between January 1 and December 31, 2004.

First run start and end dates	Title	Eps	Studio	Director	Alternate Title	Ref.
January 1 – January 8, 2005	Koukaku Kidoutai: Stand Alone Complex 2nd GIG	26	Production I.G	Kenji Kamiyama	攻殻機動隊 S.A.C. 2nd GIG	
January 3 – March 27	Divergence Eve 2: Misaki Chronicles	13	Radix	Hiroshi Negishi	みさきクロニクル 〜ダイバージェンス・イヴ〜	
January 4 – March 28	Mezzo DSA	13	Arms	Yasuomi Umetsu	メゾ	
January 7 – March 31	Gokusen	13	Madhouse	Yūzō Satō	ごくせん	
January 7 – December 29	SD Gundam Force	52	Sunrise	Yūichi Abe	SDガンダムフォース	
January 8 – April 1	Jubei-chan 2: The Counterattack of Siberia Yagyu	13	Madhouse	Hiroshi Nagahama	十兵衛ちゃん2 ～シベリア柳生の逆襲～	
January 8 – March 31	Maria Watches Over Us	13	Studio Deen	Yukihiro Matsushita	マリア様がみてる	
January 9 – March 26	Area 88	12	Group TAC	Isamu Imakake	エリア88	
January 9 – March 26	Gravion Zwei	12	Gonzo	Masami Ōbari	超重神グラヴィオンツヴァイ	
January 9 – March 26	Yumeria	12	Studio Deen	Keitaro Motonaga	ゆめりあ	
January 9 – December 24	Transformers: Energon	51	Actas	Yutaka Satō (1-5); Jun Kawagoe (1-13); Takashi Sano (6-51)	トランスフォーマー スーパーリンク	
January 11 – June 27	Monkey Turn	25	OLM	Kunitoshi Okajima	モンキーターン	
January 12 – March 29	Burn Up Scramble	12	AIC	Hiroki Hayashi	バーンナップスクランブル	
January 13 – March 2	Chou Henshin Cosprayers	8	Imagin; Studio Live	Takeo Takahashi	超変身コス∞プレイヤー	
January 15 – July 3	Daphne in the Brilliant Blue	24	J.C.Staff	Takashi Ikehata	光と水のダフネ	
January 20 – April 5	Diamond Daydreams	12	Studio Deen	Bob Shirohata	北へ。 ～Diamond Dust Drops～	
February 1 – January 30, 2005	Futari wa Pretty Cure	49	Toei Company	Daisuke Nishio	ふたりはプリキュア	
February 1 – February 6, 2005	Kaiketsu Zorori	52	Ajia-do	Tsutomu Shibayama (eps 53-149)	かいけつゾロリ	
February 3 – May 18	Paranoia Agent	13	Madhouse	Satoshi Kon	妄想代理人	
February 24 – May 25	Yugo the Negotiator	13	G&G Direction (Pakistan Chapter); Artland (Russia Chapter)	Seiji Kishi (Pakistan Chapter); Shinya Hanai (Russia Chapter)	勇午 ～交渉人～	
March 9 – April 27	Hit wo Nerae!	8	Imagin; Studio Live	Takeo Takahashi	ヒットをねらえ!	
March 21 – June 27	Hi no Tori	13	Tezuka Productions	Ryousuke Takahashi	火の鳥	
March 27 – April 1	Massugu ni Ikou. (Season 2)	5	Yumeta Company	Kiyotaka Isako	まっすぐにいこう。第2期	
April 1 – September 23	Kenran Butou Sai: The Mars Daybreak	26	Bones	Kunihiro Mori	絢爛舞踏祭ザ･マーズ･デイブレイク	
April 2 – June 18	Koi Kaze	13	A.C.G.T	Takahiro Omori	恋風	
April 2 – June 18	Kono Minikuku mo Utsukushii Sekai	12	Gainax; Shaft	Shouji Saeki	この醜くも美しい世界	
April 2 – September 17	Tenjho Tenge	24	Madhouse	Toshifumi Kawase	天上天下	
April 2 – September 24	Saiyuki Gunlock	26	Pierrot	Tetsuya Endō	最遊記RELOAD GUNLOCK	
April 3 – December 25	Mermaid Melody Pichi Pichi Pitch Pure	39	Actas; Synergy Japan	Yoshitaka Fujimoto	マーメイドメロディーぴちぴちピッチピュア	
April 3 – April 4, 2011	Sgt. Frog	358	Sunrise	Junichi Sato (until 2006); Yusuke Yamamoto (#1–103); Nobuhiro Kondo (#104–358)	ケロロ軍曹	
April 3 – October 9	Aishiteruze Baby	26	TMS Entertainment	Masaharu Okuwaki	愛してるぜ ベイベ★★	
April 3 – February 25, 2006	Kyou kara Maou!	78	Studio Deen	Junji Nishimura	今日からマ王！	
April 3 – September 25	Dan Doh!!	26	Tokyo Kids	Hidetoshi Ōmori	ダンドー	
April 4 – June 27	Midori Days	13	Pierrot	Tsuneo Kobayashi	美鳥の日々	
April 4 – March 27, 2005	Legendz: Yomigaeru Ryuuou Densetsu	50	Gallop	Akitarō Daichi	レジェンズ 甦る竜王伝説	
April 4 – March 27, 2005	The Marshmallow Times	52	Seoul Movie; Studio Comet	Hiroshi Fukutomi; Seung Il Lee	マシュマロ通信 <タイムス>	
April 4 – June 20	Hanaukyou Maid-tai: La Verite	12	Daume	Takuya Nonaka	花右京メイド隊 La Verite	
April 5 – March 28, 2005	Get Ride! AMDriver	51	Studio Deen	Isao Torada	Get Ride! アムドライバー	
April 5 – June 28	Sensei no Ojikan: Dokidoki School Hours	13	J.C.Staff; Studio Guts; Studio Matrix	Yoshiaki Iwasaki	せんせいのお時間	
April 6 – September 28	Mutsu Enmei Ryuu Gaiden: Shura no Toki	26	Studio Comet	Shin Misawa	陸奥圓明流外伝 修羅の刻	
April 6 – June 29	Shinkon Gattai Godannar!! (Season 2)	13	AIC ASTA; OLM	Yasuchika Nagaoka	神魂合体ゴーダンナー!! SECOND SEASON	
April 6 – September 28	Madlax	26	Bee Train	Kōichi Mashimo	マドラックス	
April 7 – September 28, 2005	Monster	74	Madhouse	Masayuki Kojima	モンスター	
April 7 – September 29	Ragnarok: The Animation	26	G&G Entertainment; Gonzo	Seiji Kishi; Kim Jung Ryool	RAGNARÖK THE ANIMATION	
April 7 – September 15	Burst Angel	24	Gonzo	Koichi Ohata	爆裂天使	
April 7 – September 22	Melody of Oblivion	24	J.C.Staff	Hiroshi Nishikiori	忘却の旋律	
April 8 – July 1	Kinnikuman II Sei: Ultimate Muscle	13	Toei Animation	Toshiaki Komura	キン肉マンII世 ULTIMATE MUSCLE	
April 8 – September 30	Tetsujin 28-go	26	Palm Studio	Yasuhiro Imagawa	鉄人28号	
April 9 – March 4, 2005	Tweeny Witches	40	Studio 4°C	Yoshiharu Ashino	魔法少女隊アルス	
April 12 – July 5	Pugyuru	13	Creators Dot Com	Hajime Kurihara	ぷぎゅる	
April 13 – June 22	Gantz	13	Gonzo	Ichiro Itano	ガンツ	
April 17 – February 18, 2006	Initial D Fourth Stage	24	A.C.G.T	Tsuneo Tominaga	頭文字〈イニシャル〉D FOURTH STAGE	
May 4 – June 29	Love♥Love?	9	Imagin; Studio Live	Takeo Takahashi	LOVE♥LOVE?	
May 20 – March 19, 2005	Samurai Champloo	26	Manglobe	Shinichirō Watanabe	サムライチャンプルー	
June 12 – December 25	Samurai 7	26	Gonzo	Toshifumi Takizawa	サムライセブン	
June 25 – December 16	Kurau Phantom Memory	24	Bones	Yasuhiro Irie	クラウ ファントムメモリー	
June 30 – September 22	Hani Hani: Operation Sanctuary	13	Radix	Shōsei Jinno	月は東に日は西に〜Operation Sanctuary〜	
June 30 – September 22	Wind: A Breath of Heart	13	Radix	Mitsuhiro Tougou	Wind -a breath of heart-	
July 4 – December 19	Monkey Turn V	25	OLM	Katsuhito Akiyama	モンキー ターン V	
July 4 – September 26	Maria-sama ga Miteru: Haru	13	Studio Deen	Yukihiro Matsushita	マリア様がみてる～春～	
July 4 – May 15, 2005	Agatha Christie's Great Detectives Poirot and Marple	39	OLM	Naohito Takahashi	アガサ・クリスティーの名探偵ポワロとマープル	
July 5 – September 27	Girls Bravo	11	AIC Spirits	Ei Aoki	GIRLSブラボー first season	
July 5 – December 27	Fafner in the Azure	26	Xebec	Nobuyoshi Habara	蒼穹のファフナーDead Aggressor	
July 7 – March 30, 2005	Otogizoushi	26	Production I.G	Mizuho Nishikubo	お伽草子	
July 7 – September 29	Galaxy Angel X	26	Madhouse; feel.	Morio Asaka; Yoshimitsu Ōhashi; Shigehito Takayanagi	ギャラクシーエンジェル4	
July 10 – September 25	Ninin ga Shinobuden	12	ufotable	Haruo Sotozaki	ニニンがシノブ伝	
July 11 – September 26	DearS	12	Daume	Iku Suzuki	ディアーズ	
July 25 – October 17	Elfen Lied	13	Arms	Mamoru Kanbe	エルフェンリート	
August 1 – June 25, 2005	Monkey Punch: Manga Katsudou Daishashin	12	TMS Entertainment	Shunji Ōga	モンキー・パンチ 漫画活動大写真	
August 1 – December 19	Sweet Valerian	18	Madhouse	Hiroaki Sakurai	スウィート・ヴァレリアン	
August 6 – October 29	Space Symphony Maetel	13	Azeta Pictures	Shinichi Masaki	宇宙交響詩メーテル ～銀河鉄道999外伝～	
August 26 – November 18	Gantz 2nd Stage	13	Gonzo	Ichirō Itano	ガンツ	
September 11 – February 26, 2005	Fuujin Monogatari	13	Production I.G	Junji Nishimura	風人物語	
September 20 – December 13	Curry no Kuni no Coburoux	13	Artland	Ryō Hirayama	カレーの国のコバ～ル	
September 30 – September 29, 2005	Bouken Ou Beet	52	Toei Animation	Tatsuya Nagamine	冒険王ビィト	
October 1 – April 1, 2005	My-HiME	26	Sunrise	Masakazu Obara	舞-HiME	
October 2 – December 25	Kakyuusei 2: Hitomi no Naka no Shoujo-tachi	13	Arms	Yōsei Morino	下級生2 ～瞳の中の少女たち～	
October 2 – December 18	Kannazuki no Miko	12	TNK	Tetsuya Yanagisawa	神無月の巫女	
October 2 – December 25	To Heart: Remember My Memories	13	AIC ASTA; OLM	Keitaro Motonaga	トゥハート ~remember my memories~	
October 2 – September 24, 2005	Rockman.EXE Stream	51	Xebec	Takao Kato	ロックマンエグゼStream	
October 2 – September 24, 2005	Viewtiful Joe	51	Group TAC	Takaaki Ishiyama	ビューティフル ジョー	
October 3 – December 19	Uta Kata	12	Hal Film Maker	Keiji Gotoh	うた∽かた	
October 3 – December 26	W~Wish	13	Picture Magic; Trinet Entertainment	Osamu Sekita	W 〜ウィッシュ〜	
October 3 – December 26	Magical Girl Lyrical Nanoha	13	Seven Arcs	Akiyuki Shinbo	魔法少女リリカルなのは	
October 3 – April 3, 2005	Zoids Fuzors	26	Tokyo Kids	Kouji Makita	ゾイド・フューザーズ	
October 3 – December 26	Ton-Ton Atta to Niigata no Mukashibanashi	13	Group TAC		トントンあったと にいがたの昔ばなし	
October 3 – December 26	Final Approach	13	Trinet Entertainment; Zexcs	Takashi Yamamoto	φなる・あぷろーち	
October 4 – December 14	Samurai Gun	13	Studio Egg	Kazuhito Kikuchi	サムライガン	
October 4 – December 27	Ryuusei Sentai Musumet	13	TNK	Shigeru Kimiya	流星戦隊ムスメット	
October 4 – April 4, 2005	Kappa no Kaikata	26	Picture Magic	Miyazaki Nagisa	カッパの飼い方	
October 5 – March 29, 2005	School Rumble	26	Studio Comet	Shinji Takamatsu	スクールランブル	
October 5 – March 29, 2005	Tsukuyomi: Moon Phase	25	Shaft	Akiyuki Shinbo	月詠 −MOON PHASE−	
October 5 – March 29, 2005	Fantastic Children	26	Nippon Animation	Takashi Nakamura	ファンタジックチルドレン	
October 5 – March 27, 2012	Bleach	366	Pierrot	Noriyuki Abe	BLEACH - ブリーチ -	
October 6 – March 30, 2005	Desert Punk	24	Gonzo	Takayuki Inagaki	砂ぼうず	
October 6 – March 30, 2005	Gankutsuou	24	Gonzo	Mahiro Maeda	巌窟王	
October 6 – March 26, 2008	Yu-Gi-Oh! GX	180	Gallop	Hatsuki Tsuji	遊☆戯☆王 デュエルモンスターズ GX	
October 6 – December 15	Ring ni Kakero 1	12	Toei Animation	Toshiaki Komura	リングにかけろ1	
October 6 – March 30, 2005	Harukanaru Toki no Naka de: Hachiyou Shou	26	Yumeta Company	Aki Tsunaki	遙かなる時空の中で〜八葉抄〜	
October 6 – March 30, 2005	Tactics	25	Studio Deen	Hiroshi Watanabe	タクティクス	
October 7 – March 31, 2005	Beck: Mongolian Chop Squad	26	Madhouse	Osamu Kobayashi	ベック	
October 7 – December 30	Futakoi	13	Telecom Animation Film	Nobuo Tomisawa	双恋	
October 8 – April 1, 2005	Zipang	26	Studio Deen	Kazuhiro Furuhashi	ジパング	
October 8 – December 24	Rozen Maiden	12	Nomad	Kou Matsuo	ローゼンメイデン	
October 9 – October 1, 2005	Gundam SEED Destiny	50	Sunrise	Mitsuo Fukuda	機動戦士ガンダムSEED DESTINY	
October 11 – December 27	Genshiken	12	Palm Studio	Takashi Ikehata	げんしけん	
October 11 – March 6, 2006	Black Jack	61	Tezuka Productions	Satoshi Kuwabara	ブラックジャック	
October 12 – March 14, 2006	Yakitate!! Japan	69	Sunrise	Yasunao Aoki	焼きたて!! ジャぱん	
October 14 – January 13, 2005	Grenadier: The Beautiful Warrior	12	Studio Live; Group TAC	Hiroshi Kōjina	グレネーダー 〜ほほえみの閃士〜	
October 27 – December 1, 2005	Legend of DUO	12	Marine Entertainment; Radix	Koichi Kikuchi	LEGEND OF DUO	
October 30 – May 14, 2005	Gakuen Alice	26	Group TAC	Takahiro Omori	学園アリス	
November 4 – February 3, 2005	Ginyuu Mokushiroku Meine Liebe	13	Bee Train	Kōichi Mashimo	吟遊黙示録 マイネリーベ	
November 13 – May 21, 2005	Major S1	26	Studio Hibari	Kenichi Kasai	メジャー （第1シリーズ）	
November 30 – September 29, 2005	Onmyou Taisenki	52	Sunrise	Masakazu Hishida	陰陽大戦記	
December 22	Kimagure Robot	10	Studio 4°C	Chie Uratani (ep 3); Masahiko Kubo (ep 4); Nobutake Ito (ep 10); Yasuhiro Aoki (eps 6-7, 9); Yasuyuki Shimizu (eps 2, 8); Yoshiharu Ashino (ep 1); Yumi Chiba (ep 5)	きまぐれロボット	

=== Original video animations ===
A list of original video animations that debuted between January 1 and December 31, 2004.

First run start and end dates	Title	Episodes	Studio	Director	Alternate Title	Ref.
January 12	Hijikata Toshizou: Shiro no Kiseki	1	Studio 4°C	Chie Uratani	土方歳三 白の軌跡	
January 22	Tenshi no Shippo Chu!: Tenshi no Utagoe	1	Tokyo Kids		天使のしっぽChu！ ~総集編~ 天使の歌声 (うたごえ)	
January 23	Tenbatsu Angel Rabbie☆	1	AIC Spirits	Shinji Ishihira	天罰エンジェルラビィ☆	
January 23 – February 25	Wolf's Rain OVA	4	Bones	Tensai Okamura	ウルフズ・レイン	
January 28	Animation Seisaku Shinkou Kuromi-chan 2	1	Yumeta Company	Akitarō Daichi	アニメーション制作進行くろみちゃん 2	
February 10	Shadow Skill: Kurudaryuu Kousatsuhou no Himitsu	1	Tandm	Kazuya Ichikawa	SHADOW SKILL ～クルダ流交殺法の秘密～	
February 24 – March 24	Tokyo Daigaku Monogatari	2	Shinkuukan	Jiro Fujimoto	東京大学物語	
February 27 – November 26	Phantom The Animation	3	Arcs Create	Keitaro Motonaga	ファントム THE ANIMATION	
March 1 – July 1	Kidou Senshi Gundam SEED MSV Astray	2	Sunrise	Katsuyoshi Yatabe	機動戦士ガンダムSEED MSV ASTRAY	
March 3 – August 18	Hunter x Hunter: Greed Island Final	14	Nippon Animation	Takeshi Hirota	HUNTER×HUNTER G・I Final	
March 17 – March 23, 2005	Angelique	3	Yumeta Company	Asumi Matsumura	オリジナルビデオアニメーション アンジェリーク	
March 20	Fuichin-san	1	Animaruya		フイチンさん	
March 25 – August 27	Interlude	3	Toei Animation	Tatsuya Nagamine (ep 2)	インタールード	
March 31 – June 15, 2007	Dai Yamato Zero-go	5	JCF	Tomoharu Katsumata	大ヤマト零号	
April 9 – September 10	Shin Getter Robo	13	Brain's Base	Jun Kawagoe; Yasuhiro Geshi (ep 8)	新ゲッターロボ	
April 11 – December 22	Cossette no Shouzou	3	Daume	Akiyuki Simbo	コゼットの肖像	
April 21	Kono Shihai kara no Sotsugyou: Ozaki Yutaka	1	Toei Animation	Hosoda Mamoru; Kado Yuriko	～この支配からの卒業～ 尾崎豊	
April 23	Galaxy Angel S	1	Madhouse	Shigehito Takayanagi	ギャラクシーエンジェルS	
April 23 – July 23	Aoi Umi no Tristia	2	ufotable	Hitoyuki Matsui	蒼い海のトリスティア	
April 23 – June 25	Lime-iro Senkitan: Nankoku Yume Roman	2	Studio Hibari	Iku Suzuki	らいむいろ戦奇譚 南国夢浪漫	
April 28	Onegai☆Twins: Natsu wa Owaranai	1	Daume	Yasunori Ide	おねがい☆ツインズ 夏は終わらない	
May 12 – October 20	Memories Off 3.5	4	Picture Magic; Rikuentai	Toshikatsu Tokoro	Memories Off 3.5 [メモリーズオフ3.5]	
May 21 – July 23	Natsu-iro no Sunadokei	2	Picture Magic; Rikuentai	Takahiro Okao	夏色の砂時計	
May 25 – October 22	Happy☆Lesson The Final	3	Studio Ranmaru	Saburo Omiya	HAPPY☆LESSON THE FINAL	
May 26	Steady x Study	1	Idea Factory	Kenichi Oonuki	ステディ×スタディ	
May 28 – August 1	Stratos 4 OVA	2	Studio Fantasia	Takeshi Mori	ストラトス・フォー OVA	
June 10	Makasete Iruka!	1	CoMix Wave Films	Akitarō Daichi	まかせてイルか！	
June 25 – December 22	Wind: A Breath of Heart OVA	3	Venet	Tsuneo Tominaga	Wind -a breath of heart- OVA	
June 25 – December 23	Teizokurei Daydream	4	HAL Film Maker	Osamu Sekita	低俗霊DAYDREAM	
June 26 – December 11	Ojamajo Doremi Na-i-sho	13	Toei Animation	Junichi Sato	おジャ魔女どれみ ナ・イ・ショ	
June 30	Hikaru no Go: Memories	1	Pierrot		ヒカルの碁 TVシリーズ超総集編「MEMORIES」	
July 1	Kishin Houkou Demonbane	1	Group TAC; View Works	Shintaro Inokawa	機神咆吼デモンベイン	
July 3	Cosplay Complex: Extra Identification	1	TNK	Shinichiro Kimura	こすぷれCOMPLEX	
July 19 – November 3	Kidou Senshi Gundam MS IGLOO: 1-nen Sensou Hiroku	3	Sunrise	Takashi Imanishi	機動戦士ガンダム MS IGLOO: 1年戦争秘録	
July 24 – September 25	Re: Cutie Honey	3	Gainax; Toei Animation	Hideaki Anno	Re:キューティーハニー	
July 28 – November 26	Honoo no Mirage: Minagiwa no Hangyakusha	3	Madhouse	Fumie Muroi	炎の蜃気楼～みなぎわの反逆者～	
August 4 – February 2, 2005	Sensei no Ojikan: Dokidoki School Hours OVA	7	J.C.Staff; Studio Guts; Studio Matrix		せんせいのお時間: Doki Doki School Hours	
August 19 – January 19, 2006	Ajisai no Uta	4	Group TAC		あじさいの唄	
August 25 – March 24, 2005	Mahou Sensei Negima!: Introduction Film	3	Xebec	Hiroshi Nishikiori	魔法先生ネギま! ～introduction Film～	
September 10 – September 22, 2005	Nurse Witch Komugi-chan Magikarte Z	2	Tatsunoko Production	Hiroshi Matsuzono (ep 1); Yoshitomo Yonetani (ep 2)	ナースウィッチ小麦ちゃんマジカルてZ	
September 24	Kaleido Star: Aratanaru Tsubasa - Extra Stage	1	Gonzo	Junichi Satō; Yoshimasa Hiraike	カレイドスター ～新たなる翼～ EXTRA STAGE	
September 30	Ichigeki Sacchuu!! Hoihoi-san	1	Daume	Takuya Satō	一撃殺虫!!ホイホイさん	
October 3 – August 25, 2006	Top wo Nerae 2! Diebuster	6	Gainax	Kazuya Tsurumaki	トップをねらえ2！DIEBUSTER	
October 20 – March 16, 2005	Sakura Taisen: Le Nouveau Paris	3	Radix	Yūsuke Yamamoto	サクラ大戦『ル・ヌーヴォー・巴里』	
November 24	Netrun-mon the Movie	1	Studio Hibari		ねとらん者 THE MOVIE	
November 25 – August 26, 2005	Akane Maniax	3	Media Factory; Silver	Tetsuya Watanabe	アカネマニアックス	
November 25 – February 24, 2006	Tales of Phantasia The Animation	4	Actas	Takuo Tominaga	テイルズ オブ ファンタジア THE ANIMATION	
December 8	Tenkuu Danzai Skelter+Heaven	1	Minami Machi Bugyousho	Yoshiaki Sato	天空断罪スケルターヘブン	
December 12	Tsuki wa Higashi ni Hi wa Nishi ni: Operation Sanctuary OVA	4	Radix	Jinno Shousei	月は東に日は西に〜Operation Sanctuary〜 OVA	
December 22 – April 22, 2005	Kujibiki Unbalance	3	Palm Studio	Takashi Ikehata	くじびきアンバランス	

== See also ==
- 2004 in animation
