= Francesca Capaldi =

American actress (born 2004)

- Born: Francesca Angelucci Capaldi; June 8, 2004 (age 22)
- Occupation: Actress
- Years active: 2011–present
- Height: 5 ft 0 in (152 cm)

Francesca Angelucci Capaldi (born June 8, 2004) is an American actress. She is best known for her roles as Chloe James in the Disney Channel sitcom Dog with a Blog (2012–15) and Nellie Chambers in the Brat web series Crown Lake (2019–20).

Capaldi voiced for The Peanuts Movie (2015), and also appeared in Max 2: White House Hero (2017), and two episodes of How I Met Your Mother (2012).

== Life and career ==
Capaldi was born to Anthony and Gina (née Angelucci) Capaldi, both of Italian descent. She resided in Carlsbad, California with her parents. She began acting with small roles in the Disney Channel Original Series A.N.T. Farm and in the CBS comedy How I Met Your Mother, as a 7-year-old Lily, who is played as an adult by Alyson Hannigan. In addition, Capaldi was featured in the pilot for The Goodwin Games. Capaldi also stars in Corbin Bernsen's independent film 3 Day Test and in Dog with a Blog on Disney Channel, her series regular debut. She started her voicing career as the voice of the Little Red-Haired Girl in the 2015 film The Peanuts Movie.

In 2019, Capaldi starred in the web series Crown Lake on Brat TV as Nellie Chambers, a girl who is targeted by an unknown person at a boarding school in 1994. She reprised the role in 2020 in a second season of Crown Lake. In 2022, it was announced that the third season of Crown Lake would be set in the present day and that Capaldi would be departing from the show.

Since Crown Lake, Capaldi starred in a few indie low budget movies. In 2024, she was in Last Night at Terrace Lanes as Kennedy, where she played a bisexual teenager hunted by a cult in a bowling alley. Also in 2024, she acted in Stinky Summer as Emily. In 2026, she starred in another indie horror called Dr. Gumball, where she plays Brie who is trying to survive against an evil clown in a hospital. The movie is currently under post production.

Capaldi is an aspiring actress, who wishes to make movies all her life. In a podcast interview with Ken Arnold, she stated she loves thriller and horror genres, and "becoming a scream queen would be an amazing career path". She mentioned she has no limits in acting, and would be open for any project, "even when the job requires extreme physical action and gore".

She currently studies Public Relations and Advertising BA at University of Southern California and temporarily resides in Los Angeles. Apart from her college life, she currently resides with her family in San Diego.

== Filmography ==
=== Film ===
| Year | Title | Role | Notes | Ref. |
|---|---|---|---|---|
| 2012 | Small Business | Haskins | | |
| 2012 | 3 Day Test | Jessie Taylor | | |
| 2015 | The Dog Who Saved Summer | Kara Bannister | | |
| 2015 | The Peanuts Movie | Little Red-Haired Girl and Frieda (voices) | Credited as Francesca Angelucci Capaldi | |
| 2017 | Max 2: White House Hero | Alex Bragov | Credited as Francesca Angelucci Capaldi | |
| 2024 | Last Night at Terrace Lanes | Kennedy | | |
| 2024 | Stinky Summer | Emily | | |
| 2026 | Dr. Gumball | Brie | | |

=== Television ===
| Year | Title | Role | Notes | Ref. |
|---|---|---|---|---|
| 2011 | A.N.T. Farm | Orphan | Episode: "SANTa's Little Helpers" | |
| 2012 | How I Met Your Mother | Young Lily Aldrin | 2 episodes | |
| 2012–2015 | Dog with a Blog | Chloe James | Main role | |
| 2013 | The Goodwin Games | Piper Goodwin | Episode: "Unaired Pilot" | |
| 2015 | Jessie | Madeline | Episode: "What a Steal" | |
| 2016 | Mack & Moxy | Trooper Francesca | Episode: "Feeding Rainbow" | |
| 2016–2017 | Whisker Haven Tales with the Palace Pets | Snowpaws (voice) | Recurring role (season 2–3) | |
| 2017 | Gwen's World of Weird | Janey Beth Walker | | |
| 2019–2020 | Crown Lake | Nellie Chambers | Main role (season 1–2) | |
