= Kate - la bisbetica domata =

Kate – the Taming of the Shrew
- English: Kate – the Taming of the Shrew
- Directed by: Roberto Lione
- Written by: Roberto Lione, Andrea Sfiligoi
- Based on: The Taming of the Shrew by William Shakespeare
- Produced by: Roberto Lione
- Cinematography: Roberto Lione
- Music by: Giovanni Bacalov
- Production companies: Crayons Pictures Srl; The Taming of The Shrew LLC
- Distributed by: Lanta srl
- Release date: 23 April 2004
- Running time: 77 minutes
- Country: Italy
- Language: Italian
- Budget: €5 million

Kate - the Taming of the Shrew [Kate – La bisbetica domata] is a 2004 stop-motion-musical adaptation film of Shakespeare's The Taming of the Shrew, directed by Roberto Lione. The film, which uses a stop motion animation based on paper cut-out figures that Lione called "papermotion", claims to be Italy's first feature-length stop-motion animation film.

== Background ==
After four years in the making for a budget expenditure of €5 million, the highly original "Kate" made its debut on 23 April 2004 at the Cartoons on the Bay festival on the Amalfi coast.

Kate updates Shakespeare's play, setting it in the 21st century with Kate as a skateboard-riding firebrand, the daughter of a spaghetti magnate, and Petruchio a womanizing "Don Giovanni" spendthrift who needs Kate's wealth to pay off his debts.

The director, Roberto Lione is a filmmaker, screenwriter, Mod-Art artist and director of photography. "Papermotion", Lione's technique of stop-motion using folded paper figures, was also used in the 53 Taco & Paco television cartoons that he coproduced with RaiFiction and in 10 theatrical 35mm shorts. Italian film critics have described his approach to film animation in Kate as "having a poetical dimension, almost metaphysical which recalls De Chirico and the Surrealists."

== Production ==
For the production of Kate, 200 custom-made bronze armatures were made for the 6 inch tall characters which were painstakingly animated by hand. Ten miniature sets were built, each with up 40 light sources. More than 50 miniature scenes were constructed. Almost a half square mile of colored paper was used and over 230,000 photos were taken, one at a time for every single frame of the film. Each animator averaged 5 seconds of filmed animation a day.

== Awards ==
The film won the prize for best full-length animation at the Chicago International Kinder Film Festival in 2004.

== Reception ==
Kate received several positive reviews:

- "…last night the audience applauded the lively and amusing Italian version of Kate, very freely inspired by Shakespeare with its allusive subtitle The Taming of the Shrew."
  — Nino Marchesano, La Repubblica, 24 April 2004
- "Kate now becomes a foul-tempered doll in paper and stop motion for the new Italian cartoon version of The Taming of the Shrew, one of the most beautiful of Shakespeare’s comedies."
  — "Cartoons on the Bay". Rai Trade 14 April 2004
- "Shakespeare in 'stop motion' - a delightful comedy with an English atmosphere, revisited with Italian taste which transformed it into an animated film for both adults and children. Inspired by Shakespeare’s masterpiece…"
  — Marida Caterini, Panorama 23 April 2004
- "And entirely made in Italy is also another delightful animated cartoon seen at Positano, 'Kate – The Taming of the Shrew,' by Roberto Lione. 'The film,' the director explained, 'cost 5 million euros and four years of hard work, and is the first feature-length film in the world ever made with the papermotion technique, which uses colored paper to craft the characters and the sets.'"
  — Luciano Giannini, Il Mattino 24 April 2004
- "A postmodern revisitation of the musical “Kiss me Kate” created with paper puppets animated in stop motion by Roberto Lione."
  — Biagio Coscia, Corriere della Sera 24 April 2004
- "Yesterday was the turn for the presentation of “Kate” an animated paper version of Shakespeare's “Taming of the Shrew”, with unusual time leaps between the centuries, to the rhythm of rock, jazz and classical music. It is another Italian product (the director is Roberto Lione) certainly original and interesting from the point of view of narrative and technical solutions ..."
  — Roberto Davide Papini, La Nazione / Il Resto del Carlino / Il Giorno 24 April 2004
