= Little Red-Haired Girl =

Peanuts character

- Peanuts character
- Charlie Brown kisses the Little Red-Haired Girl in It's Your First Kiss, Charlie Brown (1977)
- First appearance: It's Your First Kiss, Charlie Brown (1977)
- Created by: Charles M. Schulz
- Voiced by: Francesca Capaldi

In-universe information
- Full name: Heather Wold (in non-strip media)
- Gender: Female
- Nationality: American

The Little Red-Haired Girl is an unseen character in the Peanuts comic strip by Charles M. Schulz, who serves as the object of Charlie Brown's affection, and a symbol of unrequited love. The character was first mentioned in the strip on November 19, 1961.

While never seen in the strip, she appears in several television specials, in which her name has been revealed as Heather Wold. Charlie Brown most often notices her while eating lunch outdoors, always failing to muster the courage to speak to her. She figures prominently in Valentine's Day strips, several of which focus on Charlie Brown's hope of getting a valentine from her. Charlie Brown typically attempts to give her a valentine but panics at the last minute.

== Appearances ==
Charlie Brown first catches sight of her in the November 19, 1961, strip, saying he would "give anything in the world if that little girl with the red hair would come over and sit with me." In July 1969, a story arc ran depicting the Little Red-Haired Girl moving away. Charlie Brown despaired that he would never see her again. He saw her from a distance later that year while skiing.

Peppermint Patty and Marcie encountered her at summer camp a few years later in 1972, where it is stated that she is aware of Charlie Brown (despite his belief that she does not know he exists) and is talking about him to the other girls at camp, although what she says of him and how she feels about him are not stated. Eventually, the Little Red-Haired Girl moved back to Charlie Brown's neighborhood, with no further mention of her ever having been away.

The 1967 Peanuts animated TV special You're in Love, Charlie Brown revolved entirely around Charlie Brown's infatuation with the Little Red-Haired Girl. After several failed attempts at making conversation with her on the last two days of school, she stuffs a note into Charlie Brown's hands as students rush past him to board the school bus. Thinking he has ruined his final chance at meeting her, he reads the letter, which affectionately states, "I like you, Charlie Brown. Signed, the Little Red-Haired Girl." Ecstatic, Charlie Brown skips his way home, realizing he has triumphed against what he considers all odds. Throughout the entirety of You're in Love, Charlie Brown, the Little Red-Haired Girl is not seen once.

The Little Red-Haired Girl returned in the 1977 special It's Your First Kiss, Charlie Brown, making her first appearance. Linus tells Charlie Brown that her name is "Heather", and that she is the Homecoming Queen. Charlie Brown becomes a wreck, trying desperately to impress her once he learns that he has been chosen to escort her to the dance after the football game. After spending nearly the entire duration of the special stressing about meeting her, he eventually musters up the courage to give her a kiss. Heather appeared again in the 1985 special Happy New Year, Charlie Brown! She did not have a speaking role in either of the aforementioned specials.

Schulz did not consider these animated appearances to be canonical, although he wrote the screenplays himself. The Little Red-Haired Girl was once seen in the comics in silhouette on May 25, 1998, dancing with Snoopy. When the storyline was adapted as part of the 2002 special A Charlie Brown Valentine, she was seen unshadowed but had a different design than suggested by the silhouette, and completely different from her two previous appearances in It's Your First Kiss, Charlie Brown and Happy New Year, Charlie Brown! A third animated version of the Little Red-Haired Girl is briefly seen in the introduction sequence used in the second season of The Charlie Brown and Snoopy Show, in which she again looks different from her other appearances. Another appearance includes the 1988 special Snoopy!!! The Musical (albeit a brief cameo). In The Peanuts Movie, she has a much different design based on the earlier mentioned silhouette, and on the test score sheet, it is revealed her name is Heather Wold, after her name in the specials and the last name of Donna Wold, the real-life inspiration behind the character. The film marked the first time the Little Red-Haired Girl spoke in all Peanuts-related media, with Charlie Brown finally succeeding in talking to her and becoming her pen pal, allowing the film to have an unambiguously happy ending without altering the franchise's basic story premise. She is voiced by Francesca Capaldi who also voiced Frieda.

== Inspiration ==
A former co-worker, Donna Mae Wold (born Donna Mae Johnson January 3, 1929, in Minneapolis, Minnesota, died August 8, 2016, in Richfield, Minnesota) was Schulz's inspiration for the character. A 1947 high school graduate, Johnson was working in the accounting department of the Art Instruction, Inc., a correspondence school where Schulz worked. Johnson and Schulz eventually became romantically involved and dated for three years, but in 1950 when Schulz proposed to her, she turned him down, saying she was already engaged. Schulz was devastated, but he and Donna remained friends for the rest of his life. Said Schulz of the relationship, "I can think of no more emotionally damaging loss than to be turned down by someone whom you love very much. A person who not only turns you down, but almost immediately will marry the victor. What a bitter blow that is."

Only one known Schulz drawing (aside from the aforementioned silhouette) of the little red-haired girl exists. It was drawn in 1950, long before she was mentioned in Peanuts. The girl in the drawing strongly resembles Patty (not to be confused with the later character Peppermint Patty), a character who was prominent in the early days of the strip. A book containing the sketch also has a photo of Johnson with Schulz. "I'd like to see Charlie Brown kick that football, and if he gets the little red-haired girl, that's fine with me", Donna said around the time Schulz announced his retirement in 1999. On Valentine's Day 2011, the Schulz Museum gave free admission to all redheaded girls and boys in honor of the Little Red-Haired Girl.

== Voiced by ==
- Francesca Capaldi (2015)
