= The International (soundtrack) =

The International (Original Motion Picture Soundtrack)

Film score by Tom Tykwer, Johnny Klimek and Reinhold Heil
- Released: February 10, 2009
- Recorded: 2008–2009
- Genre: Film score
- Length: 60:17
- Label: Varèse Sarabande
- Producers: Tom Tykwer; Johnny Klimek; Reinhold Heil

Tom Tykwer chronology
Perfume: The Story of a Murderer (2008)	The International (2009)	Three (2010)

Johnny Klimek chronology
Blackout (2008)	The International (2009)	Stronger Than Blood (2010)

Reinhold Heil chronology
Blackout (2008)	The International (2009)	Stronger Than Blood (2010)

The International (Original Motion Picture Soundtrack) is the film score to the 2009 film The International directed by Tom Tykwer, who also co-scored the film with his recurrent collaborators Johnny Klimek and Reinhold Heil. It was released through Varèse Sarabande on February 10, 2009.

== Background ==
As with all of Tykwer's films since Winter Sleepers (1997), the music for The International is composed by Tykwer along with his recurrent collaborators and friends Johnny Klimek and Reinhold Heil. The score consists of electronic and percussive music that is reminiscent of the James Bond music. It is performed by the Berlin Pops Orchestra conducted by Joris Barsch Buhle and orchestrations done by Jonathan Shanes and Gene Pritsker. Heil stated that the music had to be more restrained than Run Lola Run (1998) and not as opulent Perfume: The Story of a Murderer (2006), adding "It's kind of cool because it's very different from both of those [...] I think it really does serve the movie."

== Track listing ==
No.	Title	Length
1.	"Meeting Schumer"	1:12
2.	"Morgue"	1:28
3.	"Salinger Comes Home"	0:30
4.	"Wexler Meets the Consultant"	2:04
5.	"Salinger in Luxembourg"	2:20
6.	"Bugs"	3:05
7.	"The Calvini Hit"	6:06
8.	"Calvini Crime Scene Investigation"	4:48
9.	"Security Check"	2:16
10.	"Driving Into NYC"	0:56
11.	"The Isaacson Files"	1:52
12.	"Tailing the Consultant"	3:46
13.	"Inside the Guggenheim"	1:25
14.	"The Guggenheim Shootout"	6:16
15.	"The Consultant's Death"	1:55
16.	"On the Way to Moody's Bail Bonds"	1:32
17.	"The Wexler Interrogation"	1:03
18.	"Ella Leaves Lou – Calvini Headquarters"	3:15
19.	"Istanbul"	2:20
20.	"Chasing Jonas Skarssen"	2:56
21.	"The International – End Title"	9:12
Total length:		60:17

== Reception ==
Mark Morton of AllMusic wrote "Tykwer, along with a composing team of Reinhold Heil and Johnny Klimek, creates a vivid musical backdrop that helps align The International with the visceral mystique of The Bourne Identity and the James Bond film series."

Sura Wood of The Hollywood Reporter wrote "Tykwer, Johnny Klimek and Reinhold Heil wrote the tension-inducing score." Todd McCarthy of Variety "the score by Tykwer, Johnny Klimek and Reinhold Heil throbs in relatively discreet fashion." A. O. Scott of The New York Times called the score "pulsating". Reviewer based at RTÉ wrote "The sound design comprises a highly individual mixture of electronic music, piano tinkles, primal base beats and tribal music: excellent. In addition, director Tykwer collaborates with Reinhold Heil and Johnny Klimek, to produce some very effective original music."

== Personnel ==
Credits adapted from AllMusic:

- Ansgar Wempe – Audio Engineer
- Berlin Pops Orchestra – Orchestra
- Bruce Winter – Mixing
- Eric Stonerook – Music Preparation
- Gabriel Mounsey – Arranger, Editing, Electronics, Mixing, Programming, Sound Design
- Gene Pritsker – Supervising Orchestrator
- Johnny Klimek – Arranger, Audio Production, Composer, Editing, Electronics, Primary Artist, Programming
- Jonathan Shanes – Music Preparation, Orchestration, Programming
- Joris Barsch Buhle – Conductor
- Kathrin Jager – Harp
- Lia Vollack – Executive in Charge of Music
- Matt Bellamy – Composer
- Maurus Ronner – Music Preparation
- Patricia Sullivan Fourstar – Mastering
- Reinhold Heil – Arranger, Audio Production, Composer, Editing, Electronics, Mixing, Piano, Primary Artist, Programming
- Robert Townson – Executive Producer
- Sebastian Trimolt – Percussion
- Tobias Lehmann – Audio Production, Mixing, Producer
- Tom Tykwer – Arranger, Audio Production, Composer, Piano, Primary Artist

== Accolades ==
Award	Category	Recipient	Result	Ref.
World Soundtrack Academy Awards	Best Original Score of the Year	Tom Tykwer, Johnny Klimek and Reinhold Heil	Nominated	
