= Perfume: The Story of a Murderer (soundtrack) =

Perfume: The Story of a Murderer (Original Motion Picture Soundtrack)

Film score by Tom Tykwer, Johnny Klimek and Reinhold Heil
- Released: 5 December 2006
- Studio: Teldex Studio, Berlin
- Genre: Film score
- Length: 69:56
- Label: EMI Classics; Angel
- Producer: Tom Tykwer; Johnny Klimek; Reinhold Heil

Tom Tykwer chronology
Paris, je t'aime (2006)	Perfume: The Story of a Murderer (2006)	The International (2009)

Johnny Klimek chronology
Paris, je t'aime (2006)	Perfume: The Story of a Murderer (2006)	John from Cincinnati (2007)

Reinhold Heil chronology
Paris, je t'aime (2006)	Perfume: The Story of a Murderer (2006)	John from Cincinnati (2007)

Perfume: The Story of a Murderer (Original Motion Picture Soundtrack) is the soundtrack to the 2006 film Perfume: The Story of a Murderer released through EMI Classics and Angel Records on 5 December 2006. The album featured the original score composed by the film's director Tom Tykwer and his collaborators Johnny Klimek and Reinhold Heil.

== Background ==
As with all of Tykwer's films since 1997's Winter Sleepers, the musical score for Perfume was composed by Tykwer and two friends, Johnny Klimek and Reinhold Heil. The score was performed by the Berlin Philharmonic and State choir Latvija, under the direction of conductor Simon Rattle. Tykwer began composing the score with Klimek and Heil the same day he started working on the screenplay. Tykwer said, "I feel like I understand very much about the structure and the motivations of the characters when I'm writing the script, but I really do understand the atmosphere and the emotional and the more abstract part of the film when I'm investigating the music, and when I'm planning the music for it. ... When I then come to the shooting, having worked for three years on the music and three years on the script, I really feel like I know exactly the two worlds and how to combine them." By the time shooting the film began, a substantial portion of music had been composed. Tykwer hired a small orchestra and recorded them performing the score. Tykwer played the recorded music on set so people could explore the atmosphere and the acoustic world of the film while they were acting in it. The music was also used instead of temp music during editing.

== Track listing ==
No.	Title	Length
1.	"Prologue – The Highest Point"	1:51
2.	"Streets of Paris"	3:11
3.	"The Girl with the Plums"	5:27
4.	"Grenouille's Childhood"	5:16
5.	"Distilling Roses"	1:52
6.	"The 13th Essence"	2:29
7.	"Lost Love"	1:45
8.	"Moorish Scents"	5:15
9.	"Meeting Laura"	4:14
10.	"The Method Works!"	3:32
11.	"Grasse in Panic"	5:33
12.	"Richis's Escape"	4:30
13.	"Laura's Murder"	3:06
14.	"Awaiting Execution"	3:06
15.	"The Perfume"	5:32
16.	"The Crowd Embrace"	3:04
17.	"Perfume – Distilled"	7:12
18.	"Epilogue – Leaving Grasse"	3:01
Total length:		69:56

== Reception ==
Blair Sanderson of AllMusic wrote "as a score that is meant to evoke the fleeting impressions of aromas and to paint the portrait of the perfumer Grenouille, the music is mysterious and haunting and has become quite popular with fans of the movie." Christian Clemmensen of Filmtracks wrote "In the end, Perfume: The Story of a Murderer might smell great if music had such capabilities, but beware an allergic reaction to its potency."

Ophelia Appleby of Voices wrote "This challenging film offers an exciting narrative and complete sensory experience, it's not a feel-good film, but it is a feel-many-things film that stands out as exceptional by means of its powerful and evocative soundtrack. You may not find it an 'easy watch' but it I guarantee it will captivate your senses. As usual, the Berlin Phill have delivered nothing but excellence."

Matt Zoller Setiz of Slant Magazine wrote "the super-lush music—credited to Tykwer, Reinhold Heil and Johnny Klimek—builds on a romantic/mystical melody that evokes John Williams' Close Encounters [of the Third Kind] score (in particular, the cut titled “The Mountain”)." Debi Moore of Dread Central called the music as "top-notch".

== Accolades ==
Award	Date of ceremony	Category	Recipient(s) and nominee(s)	Result	Ref.
European Film Awards	1 December 2007	European Composer	Tom Tykwer, Johnny Klimek and Reinhold Heil	Nominated	
German Film Awards	4 May 2007	Best Film Score	Tom Tykwer, Johnny Klimek and Reinhold Heil	Nominated	
International Film Music Critics Association	6 February 2007	Film Score of the Year	Tom Tykwer, Johnny Klimek and Reinhold Heil	Nominated	
Saturn Awards	10 May 2007	Best Score	Tom Tykwer, Johnny Klimek and Reinhold Heil	Nominated	

== Personnel ==
- Choir – State Choir Latvija
- Music composer and producer – Johnny Klimek, Reinhold Heil, Tom Tykwer
- Conductor – Kristian Järvi, Simon Rattle
- Orchestra – Berliner Philharmoniker
- Soprano Vocals – Chen Reiss, Melanie Mitrano, Victor De Maiziere
