= Run Lola Run (soundtrack) =

Run Lola Run (Original Motion Picture Soundtrack)

Soundtrack album by Tom Tykwer, Johnny Klimek, Reinhold Heil and various artists
- Released: 15 June 1999
- Recorded: 1998
- Studios: PowerBlue Music, Santa Barbara, California; Basement Studio, Stuttgart; Klimax Studio, Berlin
- Genres: Film score; electronic; experimental; remix
- Length: 76:55
- Label: TVT

Tom Tykwer chronology
Winter Sleepers (1997)	Run Lola Run (1998)	The Princess and the Warrior (2000)

Johnny Klimek chronology
Winter Sleepers (1997)	Run Lola Run (1998)	Paradise Mall (1999)

Reinhold Heil chronology
Go for Gold! (1997)	Run Lola Run (1998)	Life Is the Main Thing (1999)

Run Lola Run (Original Motion Picture Soundtrack) is the soundtrack album to the 1998 film Run Lola Run directed by Tom Tykwer, who also co-composed the film music and score with his collaborators Johnny Klimek and Reinhold Heil. The soundtrack was released by TVT Records on 15 June 1999, featuring 16 songs mostly contributed from Franka Potente and Susie van der Meer, along with various remixes.

== Background ==
Tykwer reunited with his collaborators Johnny Klimek and Reinhold Heil after Winter Sleepers (1997) to score for Run Lola Run. The soundtrack includes numerous musical quotations of the sustained string chords of The Unanswered Question, an early 20th-century chamber ensemble work by American composer Charles Ives. In the original work, the chords are meant to represent "the Silences of the Druids—who Know, See and Hear Nothing". The techno soundtrack established dialectical relation between motifs of the movie: Rhythm, Repetition, and Interval among various spatio-temporal logics. This produces unification of contradictions like Time and Space or The cyclical and the linear.

== Reception ==
Daisy Jones of Vice wrote "One of the weirdest things about the Run Lola Run soundtrack, though, is that it literally doesn't stop. There might be a few brief moments here and there in which the music fades – some dialogue that requires your full attention, a micro pause between songs – but in general, the music is relentless, like an extended music video [...] the music in Run Lola Run somehow manages to find this energy and capture it." Dan Lucas of Drowned in Sound wrote "The music is as important as anything else in the film. This is Lola Rennt Original Soundtrack, not Lola Rennt: Original Soundtrack nor Lola Rennt – Original Soundtrack; there is no separation. The film would not work without its music and its music does not work without the film. This is 50% of something. It is Marge' solo spin-off."

Kali Wallace of Reactor complimented the score, saying "it's fast-paced, bass-heavy techno that starts as soon as the film begins and never lets up [...] for the most part, the entire film is accompanied by that amazing, unrelenting techno score. It's techno not just because it comes from Germany in the '90s, but because one of the most familiar traits of techno is its layered, rhythmic, looping structure, where musical patterns and themes are repeated, altered, and piled atop each other with no real sense of beginning or end. The ways the music echoes the structure the film are obvious: the rhythm of Lola's footsteps as she runs, the way each loop serves as a variation on the same theme, the way the music pauses when the story's forward momentum pauses." Pitchfork rated 4.9 out of 10 and wrote "if you're one of the many getting hooked on this film, and you need a better soundtrack for your hours spent in front of the Playstation, this could hit the spot." Andy Hinds of AllMusic wrote "this is one of the most cohesive soundtrack albums in recent memory, and the music is excellent."

== Track listing ==
All tracks are written by Tom Tykwer, Johnny Klimek and Reinhold Heil, except where noted.

Introduction
No.	Title	Writer(s)	Artist(s)	Length
1.	"Believe"		Franka Potente	4:54
2.	"Introduction"			5:44
3.	"Running One"		Franka Potente	5:29
4.	"Supermarket"		Johnny Klimek	4:40
5.	"Running Two"		Franka Potente	4:11
6.	"Running Three"		Franka Potente and Susie van der Meer	4:56
7.	"Casino"			7:09
8.	"Somebody Has to Pay"	Susie van der Meer	Susie van der Meer	3:23
9.	"Wish (Komm zu mir)"	Thomas Dürr and Tom Tykwer	Franka Potente and Thomas D	4:05
10.	Untitled (Remix)		Sun Electric	4:56
11.	"Supermarket" (Super Clemek Remix)		Clemek feat. Clé	5:28
12.	"Running One" (Large Mix)		Lee Spencer and Johnny Klimek	4:42
13.	"Running Two" (Remix)		Operation Phoenix	4:08
14.	"Casino" (Solid State Remix)		Tommi Eckart	5:43
15.	"(Big) Wish"	Thomas Dürr and Tom Tykwer	Franka Potente and Thomas D	3:53
16.	"Rock Me"	Antony Sandor	Pills	3:34
Total length:				76:55

== Charts ==
Chart (1998)	Peak position
Australian Albums (ARIA)	37

== Accolades ==
Award	Category	Nominee(s)	Result	Ref.
Chicago Film Critics Association Awards	Best Original Score	Tom Tykwer, Johnny Klimek and Reinhold Heil	Nominated	

== Personnel ==
Credits adapted from liner notes:

- Music composers and producers – Johnny Klimek, Reinhold Heil, Tom Tykwer
- Recording and mixing – Johnny Klimek, Reinhold Heil
- Recording studios – PowerBlue Music (Santa Barbara, California), Basement Studio (Stuttgart)
- Additional recording – Kai-Uwe Kohlschmidt at Klimax Studio, Berlin
- Mastering – Chris Ellman at Bernie Grundman Mastering, Hollywood
- Music supervision – Klaus Frers, Stefan Broedner (Daydream Filmmusic Productions)
- Executive consultant – Shiro Gutzie
