= Cloud Atlas (soundtrack) =

Cloud Atlas (Original Motion Picture Soundtrack)

Soundtrack album by Johnny Klimek, Tom Tykwer and Reinhold Heil
- Released: 23 October 2012 (digital); 13 November 2012 (physical)
- Recorded: 2012
- Genre: Film score
- Length: 77:25
- Label: WaterTower; Sony Classical
- Producer: Johnny Klimek; Tom Tykwer; Reinhold Heil

Johnny Klimek chronology
Killer Elite (2012)	Cloud Atlas (2012)	Open Heart (2012)

Tom Tykwer chronology
Nairobi Half Life (2012)	Cloud Atlas (2012)	Pink Children (2012)

Reinhold Heil chronology
Awake (2012)	Cloud Atlas (2012)	Haunt (2013)

Cloud Atlas (Original Motion Picture Soundtrack) is the soundtrack to the 2012 film Cloud Atlas directed by the Wachowskis and Tom Tykwer, who co-composed the score with Reinhold Heil and Johnny Klimek. The film contains approximately two hours of original music. WaterTower Music and Sony Classical Records released the soundtrack album via digital download on 23 October 2012 and CD on 13 November 2012. It was further nominated for the Golden Globe Award for Best Original Score.

== Development ==
The film's co-director Tom Tykwer contributed music to the film along with his longtime collaborators Reinhold Heil and Johnny Klimek. Both Klimek and Tykwer contributed additional music to Don Davis' score for The Matrix Revolutions (2003) directed by Wachowskis and shared a rapport with the directors. According to Tykwer, music became a character for the film that supported several elements of the film.

The score was written even before the film began production. The music was recorded in Leipzig, Germany with the MDR Radio Symphony Orchestra and the Leipzig Radio Chorus, and Gene Pritsker served as the orchestrator. He further adapted the score into a stand-alone six-movement symphony for the orchestra, called "The Cloud Atlas Sextet", written by one of the film's main characters, ambitious composer Robert Frobisher (Ben Whishaw) along with a group of six musicians. Tykwer described it as a melody that begins from "a simple string line to a riff in a 1970s rock piece, to a jazz sextet playing in the background at the Cavendish party" along with a group of subjective voices. The piece was the eventual motif of the film's musical palette as it demanded something beautiful and malleable enough to take the audiences through five centuries.

== Reception ==
The Cloud Atlas soundtrack received critical acclaim. Film Music Magazine critic Daniel Schweiger described the soundtrack as "a singular piece of multi-themed astonishment", and selected it as one of the best soundtracks of 2012. Filmtracks.com gave a mixed review, describing it as "a score that may sound superficially impressive in its ambition but is revealed to be a lifeless zombie in search for its soul." Danny Bowes of Reactor wrote " The music, as it should be with one whole storyline being about the composition of the "Cloud Atlas sextet," is wonderful." James Christopher Monger of AllMusic wrote "Tykwer, Klimek and Heil could have tried to take on Cloud Atlas' immensity head on, utilizing the kind of explosive, heavy artillery that has become the norm for big spectacle films (which is what many composers would have done after feasting their eyes on the film's epic, sumptuous visuals), but by choosing a more nuanced discipline, they've not only helped to illuminate the film's emotional core, they've gone and unearthed it."

== Track listing ==
No.	Title	Featuring artist	Length
1.	"Prelude: The Atlas March"		1:15
2.	"Cloud Atlas Opening Title"		3:47
3.	"Travel to Edinburgh"		1:42
4.	"Luisa's Birthmark"		3:00
5.	"Cavendish In Distress"		1:23
6.	"Papa Song"		4:15
7.	"Sloosha's Hollow"	Gabriel Mounsey	2:59
8.	"Sonmi-451 Meets Chang"		3:34
9.	"Won't Let Go"		4:09
10.	"Kesselring"		1:54
11.	"The Escape"		5:43
12.	"Temple Of Sacrifice"		2:03
13.	"Catacombs"		1:35
14.	"Adieu"		4:15
15.	"New Direction"		1:46
16.	"All Boundaries Are Conventions"		2:38
17.	"The Message"		2:13
18.	"Chasing Luisa Rey"		4:53
19.	"Sonmi's Discovery"		3:23
20.	"Death Is Only A Door"		3:48
21.	"Cloud Atlas Finale"		4:17
22.	"The Cloud Atlas Sextet for Orchestra"	Gene Pritsker	4:57
23.	"Cloud Atlas End Title"	Gene Pritsker	7:56
Total length:			77:25

== Accolades ==
List of awards and nominations
Organization	Award category	Nominee(s)	Result
Austin Film Critics Association Awards	Best Score	Johnny Klimek, Tom Tykwer and Reinhold Heil	Won
Central Ohio Film Critics Association	Best Score	Johnny Klimek, Tom Tykwer and Reinhold Heil	Nominated
CinEuphoria Awards	Best Original Music – International Competition	Johnny Klimek, Tom Tykwer and Reinhold Heil	Nominated
German Film Awards	Best Film Music	Johnny Klimek, Tom Tykwer and Reinhold Heil	Nominated
Golden Globe Awards	Best Original Score	Johnny Klimek, Tom Tykwer and Reinhold Heil	Nominated
Houston Film Critics Society Awards	Best Original Score	Johnny Klimek, Tom Tykwer and Reinhold Heil	Won
International Film Music Critics Association Awards	Film Score of the Year	Johnny Klimek, Tom Tykwer and Reinhold Heil	Nominated
International Film Music Critics Association Awards	Best Original Score for a Fantasy/Science Fiction/Horror Film	Johnny Klimek, Tom Tykwer and Reinhold Heil	Nominated
International Film Music Critics Association Awards	Film Music Composition of the Year	Johnny Klimek, Tom Tykwer and Reinhold Heil for "The Cloud Atlas Sextet for Orchestra"	Nominated
St. Louis Gateway Film Critics Association	Best Music Score/Soundtrack	Johnny Klimek, Tom Tykwer and Reinhold Heil	Nominated

== Personnel ==
Credits adapted from CD liner notes:

- Music composed, produced, arranged and edited by – Johnny Klimek, Reinhold Heil, Tom Tykwer
- Programming and mixing – Gabriel Isaac Mounsey
- Additional programming – Jordan Balagot, Justin Bell
- Recording – Max Knoth, Olaf Dix
- Additional recording – Thomas Wieber
- Mastering – Patricia Sullivan
- Music consultant – Charlotte Goltermann, Tina Funk

Cover artwork

- Booklet editing and design – WLP Ltd.
- Liner notes – Tom Tykwer

Management

- Music business and legal affairs – Marcellus Puhlemann
- Head of music management and ADR – Carsten Dufner
- Licensing – Mark Cavell
- Product development – Isabelle Tulliez

Orchestra and choir

- Orchestra – MDR Leipzig Radio Symphony
- Choir – MDR Leipzig Radio Choir
- Orchestrator – Justin Bell
- Lead orchestrators – Gene Pritsker
- Additional orchestrators – Charles Coleman, Max Knoth, Vincent Oppido
- Conductor – Kristjan Järvi
- Assistant conductor – Torodd Wigum
- Concertmaster – Waltraud Wächter
- Choir director – Howard Arman
- Orchestra manager – Matthias Winkler
- Orchestra recording and mixing – Matthias Sachers, Robert Baldowski
- Assistant engineers – Guido Thomaschinski, Mathias Metzner
- Copyist – Vincent Oppido

Soloists

- Clarinet – Michyo Suzuki
- Piano – Ragna Schirmer, Taka Kigawa
