= International Film Music Critics Association Award for Film Score of the Year =

Annual award given by IFMCA

The International Film Music Critics Association Award for Film Score of the Year, now simply Score of the Year, is an annual award given by the International Film Music Critics Association, or the IFMCA. The award was given to the composer of a film score deemed to be the best in a given year. The award was first given in 1998 till 2000, before going a four-year hiatus. It has been awarded every year since 2004. In 2022, the category was renamed "Score of the Year", awarding its first ever television score with the honor.

== Winners and nominations ==
=== 1990s ===
Year	Film	Composer(s)
1998	Mulan	Jerry Goldsmith
1998	The Avengers	Joel McNeely
1998	Dangerous Beauty	George Fenton
1998	The Mask of Zorro	James Horner
1998	Saving Private Ryan	John Williams
1999	The Mummy	Jerry Goldsmith
1999	Angela's Ashes	John Williams
1999	The Iron Giant	Michael Kamen
1999	The Legend of 1900	Ennio Morricone
1999	The Matrix	Don Davis
1999	The Ninth Gate	Wojciech Kilar
1999	The Red Violin	John Corigliano
1999	Sleepy Hollow	Danny Elfman
1999	Star Wars: Episode I – The Phantom Menace	John Williams
1999	The 13th Warrior	Jerry Goldsmith

=== 2000s ===
Year	Film	Composer(s)
2000	Gladiator	Hans Zimmer
2000	Chicken Run	Harry Gregson-Williams and John Powell
2000	Crouching Tiger, Hidden Dragon	Tan Dun
2000	Dinosaur	James Newton Howard
2000	Hollow Man	Jerry Goldsmith
2000	Malena	Ennio Morricone
2000	Mission to Mars	Ennio Morricone
2000	The Patriot	John Williams
2000	The Perfect Storm	James Horner
2000	Unbreakable	James Newton Howard
2004	The Incredibles	Michael Giacchino
2004	The Aviator	Howard Shore
2004	Hellboy	Marco Beltrami
2004	Sky Captain and the World of Tomorrow	Edward Shearmur
2004	The Village	James Newton Howard
2005	Memoirs of a Geisha	John Williams
2005	Harry Potter and the Goblet of Fire	Patrick Doyle
2005	King Kong	James Newton Howard
2005	The New World	James Horner
2005	Star Wars: Episode III – Revenge of the Sith	John Williams
2006	Lady in the Water	James Newton Howard
2006	The Black Dahlia	Mark Isham
2006	The Da Vinci Code	Hans Zimmer
2006	The Fountain	Clint Mansell
2006	Perfume: The Story of a Murderer	Tom Tykwer, Reinhold Heil and Johnny Klimek
2006	X-Men: The Last Stand	John Powell
2007	Atonement	Dario Marianelli
2007	The Golden Compass	Alexandre Desplat
2007	Lust, Caution	Alexandre Desplat
2007	Ratatouille	Michael Giacchino
2007	Zodiac	David Shire
2008	The Curious Case of Benjamin Button	Alexandre Desplat
2008	The Dark Knight	James Newton Howard and Hans Zimmer
2008	Indiana Jones and the Kingdom of the Crystal Skull	John Williams
2008	Standard Operating Procedure	Danny Elfman
2008	WALL-E	Thomas Newman
2009	Up	Michael Giacchino
2009	Avatar	James Horner
2009	Drag Me to Hell	Christopher Young
2009	Star Trek	Michael Giacchino
2009	The Twilight Saga: New Moon	Alexandre Desplat

=== 2010s ===
Year	Film	Composer(s)
2010	How To Train Your Dragon	John Powell
2010	The Ghost Writer	Alexandre Desplat
2010	Inception	Hans Zimmer
2010	The King's Speech	Alexandre Desplat
2010	Tron: Legacy	Daft Punk
2011	War Horse	John Williams
2011	The Adventures of Tintin	John Williams
2011	The Artist	Ludovic Bource
2011	The Greatest Miracle	Mark McKenzie
2011	Hugo	Howard Shore
2012	Life of Pi	Mychael Danna
2012	Cloud Atlas	Tom Tykwer, Reinhold Heil and Johnny Klimek
2012	The Hobbit: An Unexpected Journey	Howard Shore
2012	The Impossible	Fernando Velázquez
2012	Lincoln	John Williams
2013	Romeo & Juliet	Abel Korzeniowski
2013	Evil Dead	Roque Baños
2013	Grand Piano	Victor Reyes
2013	Gravity	Steven Price
2013	The Hobbit: The Desolation of Smaug	Howard Shore
2014	Interstellar	Hans Zimmer
2014	The Grand Budapest Hotel	Alexandre Desplat
2014	How to Train Your Dragon 2	John Powell
2014	Maleficent	James Newton Howard
2014	The Monkey King	Christopher Young
2015	Star Wars: The Force Awakens	John Williams
2015	Cinderella	Patrick Doyle
2015	The Hateful Eight	Ennio Morricone
2015	Jupiter Ascending	Michael Giacchino
2015	Wolf Totem	James Horner
2016	Arrival	Jóhann Jóhannsson
2016	Fantastic Beasts and Where to Find Them	James Newton Howard
2016	La La Land	Justin Hurwitz
2016	Nocturnal Animals	Abel Korzeniowski
2016	The Red Turtle	Laurent Perez del Mar
2017	Phantom Thread	Jonny Greenwood
2017	The Post	John Williams
2017	The Shape of Water	Alexandre Desplat
2017	Star Wars: The Last Jedi	John Williams
2017	War for the Planet of the Apes	Michael Giacchino
2018	Solo: A Star Wars Story	John Powell
2018	Black Panther	Ludwig Göransson
2018	First Man	Justin Hurwitz
2018	Mary Poppins Returns	Marc Shaiman
2018	Max & Me	Mark McKenzie
2019	Star Wars: The Rise of Skywalker	John Williams
2019	How to Train Your Dragon: The Hidden World	John Powell
2019	Joker	Hildur Guðnadóttir
2019	Little Women	Alexandre Desplat
2019	1917	Thomas Newman

=== 2020s ===
Year	Film	Composer(s)
2020	The Personal History of David Copperfield	Christopher Willis
2020	The Call of the Wild	John Powell
2020	Enola Holmes	Daniel Pemberton
2020	Fukushima 50	Tarō Iwashiro
2020	Wonder Woman 1984	Hans Zimmer
2021	Coppelia	Maurizio Malagnini
2021	Dune	Hans Zimmer
2021	The Green Knight	Daniel Hart
2021	Jungle Cruise	James Newton Howard
2021	The Last Duel	Harry Gregson-Williams
2022	The Lord of the Rings: The Rings of Power	Bear McCreary, theme by Howard Shore
2022	Avatar: The Way of Water	Simon Franglen
2022	The Batman	Michael Giacchino
2022	The Fabelmans	John Williams
2022	Nope	Michael Abels
2023	Indiana Jones and the Dial of Destiny	John Williams
2023	The Boy and the Heron	Joe Hisaishi
2023	Godzilla Minus One	Naoki Satō
2023	Oppenheimer	Ludwig Göransson
2023	The Piper	Christopher Young
2024	The Lord of the Rings: The Rings of Power	Bear McCreary
2024	Avatar: The Last Airbender	Takeshi Furukawa
2024	Here	Alan Silvestri
2024	Kensuke's Kingdom	Stuart Hancock
2024	The Wild Robot	Kris Bowers
2025	Avatar: Fire and Ash	Simon Franglen
2025	The Fantastic Four: First Steps	Michael Giacchino
2025	Frankenstein	Alexandre Desplat
2025	Jurassic World: Rebirth	Alexandre Desplat
2025	Sinners	Ludwig Göransson
