= Cloud Atlas (film) =

2012 film directed by Tom Tykwer and the Wachowskis

- Theatrical release poster
- Directed by: Lana Wachowski; Tom Tykwer; Lilly Wachowski (Note: Credited as Andy Wachowski.)
- Written by: Lana Wachowski; Tom Tykwer; Lilly Wachowski
- Based on: Cloud Atlas by David Mitchell
- Produced by: Grant Hill; Stefan Arndt; Lana Wachowski; Tom Tykwer; Lilly Wachowski; Alexander Rodnyansky
- Starring: Tom Hanks; Halle Berry; Jim Broadbent; Hugo Weaving; Jim Sturgess; Doona Bae; Ben Whishaw; James D'Arcy; Zhou Xun; Keith David; Susan Sarandon; Hugh Grant
- Cinematography: John Toll; Frank Griebe
- Edited by: Alexander Berner
- Music by: Tom Tykwer; Johnny Klimek; Reinhold Heil
- Production companies: Cloud Atlas Productions; X Filme Creative Pool; Anarchos Productions
- Distributed by: Warner Bros. Pictures (Note: Co-distributed with X-Verleih in Germany.) (Select territories); Focus Features International (International)
- Release dates: 8 September 2012 (TIFF); 26 October 2012 (United States); 15 November 2012 (Germany)
- Running time: 172 minutes
- Countries: Germany; United Kingdom; United States
- Language: English
- Budget: $100–146.7 million
- Box office: $130.5 million

Cloud Atlas is a 2012 science fiction film written and directed by the Wachowskis and Tom Tykwer. Based on the 2004 novel by David Mitchell, it has multiple plots occurring during six eras and features an ensemble cast who perform multiple roles across these time periods.

The film was produced by Grant Hill and Stefan Arndt, in addition to the Wachowskis and Tykwer. During its four years of development, the producers had difficulties securing financial support. It was eventually produced with a budget between US$100 million and US$146.7 million provided by independent sources, making it one of the most expensive independent films ever produced. Filming for Cloud Atlas began in September 2011 at Babelsberg Studio in Potsdam-Babelsberg, Germany.

It premiered on 8 September 2012 at the 37th Toronto International Film Festival, and was publicly released on 26 October 2012 in conventional and IMAX cinemas. Critics were polarized, causing it to be included on various "Best Film" and "Worst Film" lists. It was nominated for a Golden Globe Award for Best Original Score for Tykwer (who co-scored the film), Johnny Klimek, and Reinhold Heil. It received several nominations at the Saturn Awards, including Best Science Fiction Film, and won for Best Editing and Best Make-up.

== Plot ==
The story jumps between eras, spanning hundreds of years, until each storyline eventually resolves. Communications from characters in prior storylines are found in some of the future storylines, connecting a few of them. Characters appear to recur in each era, but change relationships to each other, suggesting reincarnation or other connection between souls through the ages.

In the Chatham Islands, 1849, American lawyer Adam Ewing is waiting for his transport ship to be repaired. He witnesses the whipping of Autua, an enslaved Moriori man. Autua stows away on Ewing's ship, having noticed Ewing's sympathy, and persuades him to advocate for Autua to join the crew as a free man. Autua saves Ewing's life before the ship's doctor, Henry Goose, can poison Ewing and steal his gold under the guise of treating him for a parasitic worm. In San Francisco, Ewing and his wife Tilda denounce her father's complicity in slavery and leave for New York to join the abolition movement.

In 1936, British composer Robert Frobisher finds work as an amanuensis to aging composer Vyvyan Ayrs, allowing Frobisher to compose his own masterpiece, "The Cloud Atlas Sextet". As the sextet nears completion, Ayrs demands credit for it and threatens to expose Frobisher's bisexuality if he refuses. Frobisher shoots and wounds Ayrs and goes into hiding. Frobisher finishes the sextet and shoots himself before his lover Rufus Sixsmith arrives.

In San Francisco, 1973, journalist Luisa Rey meets Sixsmith, now a nuclear physicist. Sixsmith tips off Rey to a conspiracy to create a catastrophe at a nuclear reactor run by Lloyd Hooks, who secretly promotes oil-energy interests. He is killed by Hooks' hitman, Bill Smoke, before he can give her a report as proof. Scientist Isaac Sachs passes her a copy of Sixsmith's report, but Smoke kills Sachs and then runs Rey's car off a bridge, destroying the report. With help from the plant's head of security, Joe Napier, Rey evades another murder attempt, and Smoke is bludegoned to death. With another copy of the report from Sixsmith's niece, Rey plans to expose the plot.

In London, 2012, Dermot Hoggins, a belligerent Irish gangster-turned-author, murders a critic after a harsh review of his memoir, generating huge sales. Hoggins's brothers threaten the publisher, the aging Timothy Cavendish, for Hoggins's profits. Timothy's brother, Denholme, tells him to hide at Aurora House, which he heads to while reading a manuscript about Rey. Believing Aurora House is a hotel, Timothy signs in, only to discover he has unwittingly committed himself to a nursing home where all outside contact is prohibited; Denholme reveals that he sent Timothy there as revenge for an affair with his wife. Timothy escapes with three other residents, resumes his relationship with an old flame, and writes a screenplay about his experience.

In Korea in 2144, Sonmi-451 is a "fabricant", a humanoid clone indentured as a fast food server in a dystopian Neo Seoul. She is exposed to ideas of rebellion by another fabricant, Yoona-939, who has obtained a clip of the movie about Cavendish's involuntary institutionalization. After Yoona is killed, Sonmi is rescued by rebel Commander Hae-Joo Chang, who exposes Sonmi to the banned writings of Aleksandr Solzhenitsyn and the full film version of Cavendish's experience. Eventually, Hae-Joo shows her that fabricants are actually recycled into food that keeps them acquiescent. Sonmi makes a public broadcast of her revelations before the authorities attack, killing Hae-Joo and recapturing Sonmi. After recounting her story to an archivist, she is executed.

In 2321, the tribesmen of a post-apocalyptic Hawaii worship Sonmi, whose recorded testimony is the basis of their sacred text. Zachry Bailey's village is visited by Meronym, a member of an advanced, off-world society called the Prescients, who are dying from a plague. Meronym is searching for a forgotten communication station on Mauna Sol to send an SOS to off-world humans. In exchange for healing Zachry's niece, Catkin, Meronym is guided by Zachry to the station where Sonmi made her recording. Returning home, Zachry finds his tribe slaughtered by the cannibalistic Kona tribe. He kills the sleeping Kona chief and rescues Catkin before he and Meronym fight off the other Kona tribesmen. Zachry and Catkin join Meronym and the Prescients as their ship leaves Big Island. On a distant planet, Zachry is married to Meronym and recounts the story to his grandchildren.

== Main cast ==
The protagonist of each story is indicated in bold.

Actor	1849	1936	1973	2012	2144	106 winters after The Fall (2321)
Tom Hanks	Dr. Henry Goose	Hotel Manager	Isaac Sachs	Dermot Hoggins	Cavendish Look-alike Actor	**Zachry Bailey**
Halle Berry	Native Woman	Jocasta Ayrs	**Luisa Rey**	Indian Party Guest	Ovid	Meronym
Jim Broadbent	Captain Molyneux	Vyvyan Ayrs	—N/a	**Timothy Cavendish**	Korean Musician	Prescient
Jim Sturgess	**Adam Ewing**	Poor Hotel Guest	Megan's Dad	Highlander	Hae-Joo Chang	Adam (Zachry's Brother-in-Law)
Ben Whishaw	Cabin Boy	**Robert Frobisher**	Record Store Clerk	Georgette Cavendish	—N/a	Tribesman
Doona Bae	Tilda Ewing	—N/a	Megan's Mom, Mexican Woman	—N/a	**Sonmi-451**, Sonmi-351, Sonmi Prostitute	—N/a
Hugo Weaving	Haskell Moore	Tadeusz Kesselring	Bill Smoke	Nurse Noakes	Boardman Mephi	Old Georgie
Hugh Grant	Rev. Giles Horrox	Hotel Heavy	Lloyd Hooks	Denholme Cavendish	Seer Rhee	Kona Chief
Susan Sarandon	Madame Horrox	—N/a	—N/a	Older Ursula	Yosouf Suleiman	Abbess
Keith David	Kupaka	—N/a	Joe Napier	—N/a	An-kor Apis	Prescient
James D'Arcy	—N/a	Rufus Sixsmith	Dr. Rufus Sixsmith	Nurse James	Archivist Park	—N/a
Zhou Xun	—N/a	—N/a	Talbot (Hotel Manager)	—N/a	Yoona-939	Rose
David Gyasi	Autua	—N/a	Lester Rey	—N/a	—N/a	Duophysite

Other cast members who appear in more than one segment include Robert Fyfe, Martin Wuttke, Brody Nicholas Lee, Alistair Petrie, and Sylvestra Le Touzel. In addition, author David Mitchell makes a cameo appearance as a double agent in the futuristic Korea section.

== Production ==
=== Development ===
The film is based on the 2004 novel Cloud Atlas by David Mitchell. Filmmaker Tom Tykwer revealed in January 2009 his intent to adapt the novel and said he was working on a screenplay with the Wachowskis, who optioned the novel. By June 2010, Tykwer had asked actors Natalie Portman, Tom Hanks, Halle Berry, James McAvoy, and Ian McKellen to star in Cloud Atlas. By April 2011, the Wachowskis joined Tykwer in co-directing the film. In the following May, with Hanks and Berry confirmed in their roles, Hugo Weaving, Ben Whishaw, Susan Sarandon, and Jim Broadbent also joined the cast. Actor Hugh Grant joined the cast days before the start of filming, and he was originally supposed to have only five roles, but he asked the Wachowskis for a sixth one and subsequently was also cast as Denholme Cavendish in the 2012 storyline. According to Berry, the character of Ovid she plays in the 2144 storyline was originally meant to be a female character played by Tom Hanks, until the directors felt that Ovid was a logical part of the journey of the soul played by Berry.

It was financed by the German production companies A Company, ARD Degeto Film and X Filme. In May 2011, Variety reported that it had a production budget of $140 million. The filmmakers secured approximately $20 million from the German government, including €10 million ($11.8 million) from the German Federal Film Fund (DFFF), €100,000 ($118,000) development funding and €1.5 million ($1.8 million) from Medienboard Berlin-Brandenburg, a German funder, as part of their plans to film at Studio Babelsberg later in 2011. The project also received €1 million ($1.2 million) financial support from Filmstiftung NRW, €750,000 ($887,000) from Mitteldeutsche Medienförderung, €30 million ($35.5 million) from UE-Fonds (the biggest proportion of the budget), and €300,000 ($355,000) from FFF Bayern, another German organization. The Wachowskis contributed approximately $7 million to the project out of their own finances. The budget was updated to $100 million.

The Wachowskis stated that due to lack of financing, the film was almost abandoned several times. However, they noted how the crew was enthusiastic and determined: "They flew—even though their agents called them and said, 'They don't have the money, the money's not closed.'" They specifically praised Tom Hanks's enthusiasm: "Warner Bros. calls and, through our agent, says they've looked at the math and decided that they don't like this deal. They're pulling all of the money away, rescinding the offer. I was shaking. I heard, 'Are you saying the movie is dead?' They were like, 'Yes, the movie is dead.' ... At the end of the meeting, Tom says, 'Let's do it. I'm in. When do we start?' ... Tom said this unabashed, enthusiastic 'Yes!' which put our heart back together. We walked away thinking, this movie is dead but somehow, it's alive and we're going to make it." "Every single time, Tom Hanks was the first who said, 'I'm getting on the plane.' And then once he said he was getting on the plane, basically everyone said, 'Well, Tom's on the plane, we're on the plane.' And so everyone flew [to Berlin to begin the film]. It was like this giant leap of faith. From all over the globe."

Some German journalists called it "the first attempt at a German blockbuster".

Cast member Hugh Grant stated about joining the project:

I thought before I read [the screenplay] that I'd turn it down, which I normally do, but I was interested in meeting the Wachowskis because I have always admired them enormously. And they are so charming and fascinating... I slightly called my own bluff. In one of the parts I am a cannibal, about 2,000 years in the future, and I thought, "I can do that. It's easy." And then I am suddenly standing in a cannibal skirt on a mountaintop in Germany and they are saying, "You know, hungry! We must have that flesh-eating, like a leopard who is so hungry", and I am thinking, "I can't do that! Just give me a witty line!"

=== Principal photography ===
Tykwer and the Wachowskis filmed parallel to each other using separate camera crews. Although all three shot scenes together when permitted by the schedule, the Wachowskis mostly directed the 1849 story and the two set in the future, while Tykwer directed the stories set in 1936, 1973, and 2012. Tykwer said that the three directors planned every segment of the film together in pre-production, and continued to work closely together through post-production. Warner Bros. Pictures representatives agreed to the film's 172-minute running time, after previously stating that it should not exceed 150 minutes.

Filming began at Studio Babelsberg in Potsdam-Babelsberg, Germany, on 16 September 2011, the base camp for the production. Other German locations include the city of Düsseldorf and the Saxon Switzerland landscape, furthermore sets in and near Edinburgh and Glasgow, Scotland, and the Mediterranean island of Majorca, Spain. Glasgow doubled for both San Francisco and London. Scenes filmed in Scotland feature the new Clackmannanshire Bridge near Alloa. The "Big Island" and "Pacific Islands" stories were shot on Majorca, mostly in the World Heritage site of the Serra de Tramuntana mountains. Scenes were shot at Cala Tuent and near Formentor, amongst others. The opening scene, when Adam Ewing meets Dr. Henry Goose, was filmed at Sa Calobra beach. Port de Sóller provided the setting for the scene when the 19th-century ship is mooring.

The film was meant to be shot in chronological order; however, Berry broke her foot two days before she was supposed to start filming. Instead of replacing her, the Wachowskis and Tykwer heavily changed the initial filming schedule, with Berry stating that "it involved travelling back and forth to Majorca and then Germany then we had to go back to Majorca when my foot got a little bit better and we were able to shoot some of that stuff on the mountainside when I could climb a little bit better. It was all over the place." According to her, "Tom [Hanks] would play nurse to me. He really took care of me. He would bring me coffee and soup and just stay with me during breaks in shooting because it was difficult for me to move around, especially at the beginning ... I basically had to be helped back to my chair after every take, but you learn to adapt to the situation. But with Tom at my side, I was really able to go beyond my own expectations of what I was capable of as an actress."

== Music ==
Besides directing the film, Tykwer co-composed the score with his longtime collaborators, Reinhold Heil and Johnny Klimek. The trio worked together for years as Pale 3, composing music for several films directed by Tykwer, most notably Run Lola Run, The Princess and the Warrior, Perfume: The Story of a Murderer, and The International. The score was recorded in Leipzig, Germany with the MDR Leipzig Radio Symphony Orchestra and the Leipzig Radio Chorus, and Gene Pritsker orchestrated the score. WaterTower Music released the soundtrack album via digital download on 23 October 2012 and CD on 13 November 2012.

== Release ==
The film premiered at the 2012 Toronto International Film Festival, where it received a 10-minute standing ovation.

It was released on 26 October 2012 in the United States. Warner Bros. Pictures distributed it in North America as well as select foreign territories including the United Kingdom, France & Belgium with Focus Features handling international sales for other territories. According to the Wachowskis, Summit Entertainment, who previously worked with Tykwer on Perfume: The Story of a Murderer, was originally going to distribute it internationally, they even claimed DreamWorks Pictures held the rights for the novel until they turnaround the project prior to Warner Bros. taking over the rights to the novel in 2011 claiming that Steven Spielberg enjoyed the six narrative tales, but couldn't do the deal due to the film's expensive budget, but ultimately rejected it. It was released in cinemas in China on 31 January 2013 with 39 minutes of cuts, including removal of nudity, a sexual scene, and numerous conversations.

=== Marketing ===
A six-minute trailer, accompanied by a short introduction by the three directors describing the ideas behind the creation of the film, was released on 26 July 2012. A shorter official trailer was released on 7 September 2012. The six-minute trailer includes three pieces of music. The opening piano music is the main theme of the soundtrack (Prelude: The Atlas March/The Cloud Atlas Sextet) by composing trio Tom Tykwer, Johnny Klimek, and Reinhold Heil, followed by an instrumental version of the song "Sonera" from Thomas J. Bergersen's album Illusions. The song in the last part is "Outro" from M83's album Hurry Up, We're Dreaming.

=== Home media ===
The film was released on home media (Blu-ray, DVD and UV Digital Copy) on May 14, 2013.

== Reception ==
=== Critical response ===
Cloud Atlas received a lengthy standing ovation at the 37th Toronto International Film Festival, where it premiered on 9 September 2012.

According to review aggregator website Rotten Tomatoes, 66% of 293 critics gave the film a positive review, with an average rating of 6.7/10. The site's critics' consensus is that "Its sprawling, ambitious blend of thought-provoking narrative and eye-catching visuals will prove too unwieldy for some, but the sheer size and scope of Cloud Atlas are all but impossible to ignore." Review aggregator Metacritic assigned the film a weighted average score of 55 out of 100, based on 45 critics, indicating "mixed or average" reviews. According to the website, the film appeared on 14 critics' top 10 lists for 2012. Audiences polled by CinemaScore gave the film an average grade of "C+" on an A+ to F scale.

Film critic Roger Ebert gave the film four out of four stars and ranked the film among his best of the year: "One of the most ambitious films ever made ... Even as I was watching Cloud Atlas the first time, I knew I would need to see it again. Now that I've seen it the second time, I know I'd like to see it a third time ... I think you will want to see this daring and visionary film ... I was never, ever bored by Cloud Atlas. On my second viewing, I gave up any attempt to work out the logical connections between the segments, stories and characters". Conversely, Slant Magazine's Calum Marsh called it a "unique and totally unparalleled disaster" and said "[its] badness is fundamental, an essential aspect of the concept and its execution that I suspect is impossible to remedy or rectify." Henry Barnes writing in The Guardian said that "At 172 minutes, Cloud Atlas carries all the marks of a giant folly, and those unfamiliar with the book will be baffled"; he gave the film two out of five stars.

Nick Pickerton, who reviewed the film for The Village Voice, said, "There is a great deal of humbug about art and love in Cloud Atlas, but it is decidedly unlovable, and if you want to learn something about feeling, you're at the wrong movie." Film critic Mark Kermode on his first viewing called it "an extremely honourable failure, but a failure", but then on a second viewing for the release of the DVD in the UK stated, "Second time around, I find it to be more engaging – still not an overall success, but containing several moments of genuine magic, and buoyed up by the exuberance of high-vaulting ambition." Village Voice and Time magazine both named Cloud Atlas the worst film of 2012.

Variety described it as "an intense three-hour mental workout rewarded with a big emotional payoff. ... One's attention must be engaged at all times as the mosaic triggers an infinite range of potentially profound personal responses." James Rocchi of MSN Movies stated, "It is so full of passion and heart and empathy that it feels completely unlike any other modern film in its range either measured through scope of budget or sweep of action." The Daily Beast called Cloud Atlas "one of the year's most important movies". Michael Cieply of The New York Times commented on the film, "You will have to decide for yourself whether it works. It's that kind of picture. ... Is this the stuff of Oscars? Who knows? Is it a force to be reckoned with in the coming months? Absolutely."

American filmmaking duo Scott Beck and Bryan Woods later chose Hugh Grant for the lead role of Mr. Reed in Heretic due to his performance in six roles in Cloud Atlas.

=== Box office ===
Despite expectations that the film could be a success, the film opened to $9.6 million from 2,008 theaters, an average of $4,787 per theater, finishing second at the U.S. box office. The debut was described as "dreadful" by Box Office Mojo. The film ultimately grossed $27.1 million in the U.S. and $103.4 million internationally for a total of $130.5 million.

=== Reaction from the crew ===
==== Directors ====
On 25 October 2012, after the premiere at Toronto (and despite the standing ovation it received there), Lilly Wachowski stated as "soon as [critics] encounter a piece of art they don't fully understand the first time going through it, they think it's the fault of the movie or the work of art. They think, 'It's a mess ... This doesn't make any sense.' And they reject it, just out of an almost knee-jerk response to some ambiguity or some gulf between what they expect they should be able to understand, and what they understand."

In the same interview, Lana Wachowski said people "will try to will Cloud Atlas to be rejected. They will call it messy, or complicated, or undecided whether it's trying to say something New Agey-profound or not. And we're wrestling with the same things that Dickens and Hugo and David Mitchell and Herman Melville were wrestling with. We're wrestling with those same ideas, and we're just trying to do it in a more exciting context than conventionally you are allowed to. ... We don't want to say, 'We are making this to mean this.' What we find is that the most interesting art is open to a spectrum of interpretation."

==== Cast ====
Tom Hanks has come to praise Cloud Atlas strongly in the years since its release. In 2013, he stated "I've seen it three times now and discovered, I swear to God, different, profound things with each viewing." In a 2017 interview, he called it "a movie that altered my entire consciousness," saying, "it's the only movie I've been in that I've seen more than twice." In a 2021 interview, Hanks called it one of his three favorite films to make, saying "We shot it on a hope and a dream and nothing but a circle of love... we were part of this big, massive ensemble of fantastic people who were just trying to do the hardest, best work on a deep throw... that whole movie was such a deep throw that making it was magical."

Halle Berry said in an interview, "It would be impossible to explain what I really feel or think about the film. It exists on so many different levels. ... I love the totality of all the characters." She talked about playing characters belonging to other ethnicities, and playing a male: "This is so poignant for an actor and someone like me, to be able to shed my skin ... you know, to do something that I would have never been able to do. If it were not for this kind of project, I still wouldn't have done that."

In a 2017 interview, Jim Broadbent called the film "great to do" and "fantastic". In another interview, he expressed disappointment over the commercial failure of the film, saying, "It was an independent film and needed a lot of money behind it to get it out there. Warner Bros. had the distribution rights but it wasn't one of their own, so I think it might have been [marketed] harder if it was."

Hugh Grant said in an October 2014 interview, "I thought [Cloud Atlas] was amazing. [The Wachowskis] are the bravest film-makers in the world, and I think it's an amazing film ... it's frustrating to me. Every time I've done something outside the genre of light comedy, the film fails to find an audience at the box office. And, sadly, Cloud Atlas never really found the audience it deserved." He later said in 2016 "the whole thing was fascinating. You know, when you work with proper people who love cinema, [the Wachowskis are] a special breed, they're not the same as people who just make movies and we happen to use cameras. [They are] people who really love cinema." In a 2024 interview with Vanity Fair, Grant said he felt the film saved his career, describing how, after a string of romantic comedies that were not financially successful, "I was completely marooned." He said the film reinvigorated his love of character acting, after being stuck doing romantic lead roles for years, "I thought, Oh yeah, I used to really enjoy doing characters—in fact, I almost used to enjoy acting."

Adaptation is a form of translation, and all acts of translation have to deal with untranslatable spots. ... [If] you are the one with knowledge of the "into" language, do what works. When asked whether I mind the changes made during the adaptation of Cloud Atlas, my response is similar: The filmmakers speak fluent film language, and they've done what works.

— David Mitchell in The Wall Street Journal; Mitchell himself has translated books from Japanese to English.

==== David Mitchell ====
Before hearing about the Wachowskis and Tykwer's project, the author David Mitchell believed it was impossible to adapt his book as a film: "My only thought was 'What a shame this could never be a film. It has a Russian doll structure. God knows how the book gets away with it but it does, but you can't ask a viewer of a film to begin a film six times, the sixth time being an hour and a half in. They'd all walk out.'"

In October 2013, Mitchell called the film "magnificent", having been very impressed by the screenplay. He was very satisfied by the casting, especially of Hanks, Berry and Broadbent. He said he could not even remember how he had imagined the characters before seeing the movie. He also supported the changes from the novel, impressed by how the Wachowskis and Tykwer successfully disassembled the structure of the book for the needs of the movie.

=== Controversy ===
The advocacy group Media Action Network for Asian Americans (MANAA) and several commentators online criticized the film's use of white actors in yellowface to portray East Asian characters in the neo-Seoul sequences. MANAA President Guy Aoki said that the film had a double standard, as it used black actors to portray black characters.

The directors responded that the same multi-racial actors portrayed multiple roles of various nationalities and races (not just East Asian) across a 500-year story arc, showing "the continuity of souls" critical to the story. The portrayal of Moriori character Autua by a Black British man was subject to similar scrutiny; it was criticized by some as offensive and confusing for audiences.

=== Accolades ===
The film was shortlisted for the Academy Award for Best Visual Effects, but was not nominated in any category.

List of awards and nominations
Organization	Award category	Nominee(s)	Result
Alliance of Women Film Journalists	Best Editing	Alexander Berner	Nominated
Alliance of Women Film Journalists	Movie You Wanted to Love But Just Couldn't	Cloud Atlas	Nominated
Art Directors Guild Awards	Best Production Design in a Fantasy Film	Hugh Bateup and Uli Hanisch	Nominated
Austin Film Critics Association Awards	Best Film	Cloud Atlas	Nominated
Austin Film Critics Association Awards	Top Ten Films	Cloud Atlas	Won
Austin Film Critics Association Awards	Best Score	Tom Tykwer, Johnny Klimek, and Reinhold Heil	Won
Bavarian Film Awards	Best Production	Stefan Arndt	Won
Black Reel Awards	Best Actress	Halle Berry	Nominated
Boston Online Film Critics Association Awards	Ten Best Films of the Year	Cloud Atlas	Won
Central Ohio Film Critics Association	Best Score	Tom Tykwer, Johnny Klimek and Reinhold Heil	Nominated
Chicago Film Critics Association	Best Film Editing	Alexander Berner	Nominated
CinEuphoria Awards	Best Film - International Competition	Lana Wachowski, Tom Tykwer, and Lilly Wachowski	Nominated
CinEuphoria Awards	Best Screenplay - International Competition	Lana Wachowski, Tom Tykwer, and Lilly Wachowski	Nominated
CinEuphoria Awards	Best Supporting Actor - International Competition	Jim Sturgess	Nominated
CinEuphoria Awards	Best Supporting Actor - International Competition	Ben Whishaw	Nominated
CinEuphoria Awards	Best Supporting Actress - International Competition	Doona Bae	Nominated
CinEuphoria Awards	Best Supporting Actress - International Competition	Halle Berry	Nominated
CinEuphoria Awards	Best Original Music - International Competition	Tom Tykwer, Johnny Klimek, and Reinhold Heil	Nominated
Costume Designers Guild Awards	Excellence in Fantasy Film	Kym Barrett and Pierre-Yves Gayraud	Nominated
Czech Lion Awards	Best Foreign Language Film	Cloud Atlas	Nominated
Critics' Choice Awards	Best Costume Design	Kym Barrett and Pierre-Yves Gayraud	Nominated
Critics' Choice Awards	Best Makeup	Cloud Atlas	Won
Critics' Choice Awards	Best Visual Effects	Cloud Atlas	Nominated
German Film Awards	Best Fiction Film	Grant Hill, Stefan Arndt, Lana Wachowski, Tom Tykwer, and Lilly Wachowski	Nominated
German Film Awards	Best Director	Lana Wachowski, Tom Tykwer, and Lilly Wachowski	Nominated
German Film Awards	Best Editing	Alexander Berner	Won
German Film Awards	Best Cinematography	Frank Griebe and John Toll	Won
German Film Awards	Best Film Music	Tom Tykwer, Johnny Klimek, and Reinhold Heil	Nominated
German Film Awards	Best Costume Design	Kym Barrett and Pierre-Yves Gayraud	Won
German Film Awards	Best Makeup	Heike Merker, Daniel Parker, and Jeremy Woodhead	Won
German Film Awards	Best Production Design	Hugh Bateup and Uli Hanisch	Won
German Film Awards	Best Sound	Markus Stemler, Lars Ginzel, Frank Kruse, Matthias Lempert, Roland Winke and Ivan Sharrock	Nominated
German Film Awards	Audience Award for German Film of the Year	Cloud Atlas	Nominated
GLAAD Media Awards	Outstanding Film - Wide Release	Cloud Atlas	Nominated
Golden Globe Awards	Best Original Score	Tom Tykwer, Johnny Klimek and Reinhold Heil	Nominated
Houston Film Critics Society Awards	Best Film	Cloud Atlas	Nominated
Houston Film Critics Society Awards	Best Original Score	Tom Tykwer, Johnny Klimek and Reinhold Heil	Won
Houston Film Critics Society Awards	Technical Achievement	Cloud Atlas	Nominated
International Film Music Critics Association Awards	Film Score of the Year	Tom Tykwer, Johnny Klimek, and Reinhold Heil	Nominated
International Film Music Critics Association Awards	Best Original Score for a Fantasy/Science Fiction/Horror Film	Tom Tykwer, Johnny Klimek, and Reinhold Heil	Nominated
International Film Music Critics Association Awards	Film Music Composition of the Year	Tom Tykwer, Johnny Klimek, and Reinhold Heil for "The Cloud Atlas Sextet for Orchestra"	Nominated
NAACP Image Awards	Outstanding Actress in a Motion Picture	Halle Berry	Nominated
Online Film Critics Society Awards	Best Adapted Screenplay	Lana Wachowski, Tom Tykwer, and Lilly Wachowski	Nominated
Online Film Critics Society Awards	Best Editing	Alexander Berner	Won
Phoenix Film Critics Society Awards	Best Production Design	Hugh Bateup and Uli Hanisch	Nominated
Phoenix Film Critics Society Awards	Best Visual Effects	Cloud Atlas	Nominated
San Diego Film Critics Society Awards	Best Production Design	Hugh Bateup and Uli Hanisch	Won
Satellite Awards	Best Editing	Alexander Berner	Nominated
Satellite Awards	Best Costume Design	Kym Barrett and Pierre-Yves Gayraud	Nominated
Satellite Awards	Best Visual Effects	Dan Glass, Geoffrey Hancock, and Stephane Ceretti	Nominated
Saturn Awards	Best Science Fiction Film	Cloud Atlas	Nominated
Saturn Awards	Best Editing	Alexander Berner	Won
Saturn Awards	Best Production Design	Hugh Bateup and Uli Hanisch	Nominated
Saturn Awards	Best Costume	Kym Barrett and Pierre-Yves Gayraud	Nominated
Saturn Awards	Best Make-up	Heike Merker, Daniel Parker, and Jeremy Woodhead	Won
St. Louis Gateway Film Critics Association	Best Cinematography	Frank Griebe and John Toll	Nominated
St. Louis Gateway Film Critics Association	Best Visual Effects	Cloud Atlas	Nominated
St. Louis Gateway Film Critics Association	Best Music Score/Soundtrack	Tom Tykwer, Johnny Klimek and Reinhold Heil	Nominated
Washington D. C. Area Film Critics Association	Best Art Direction	Uli Hanisch and Hugh Bateup (production designers), Peter Walpole and Rebecca Alleway (set decorators)	Won
Young Artist Award	Best Performance in a Feature Film - Supporting Young Actress Ten and Under	Raevan Lee Hanan	Nominated

== Bibliography ==
- "Hollywood stars at Bo'ness". The Railway Magazine. Vol. 159, no. 1345. Horncastle: Mortons Media Group. May 2013. p. 65. ISSN 0033-8923. OCLC 750645684.
