= Susie van der Meer =

German singer-songwriter (born 1973)

Susie van der Meer (born 1973) is a German singer-songwriter. She is known primarily for her contribution to the Run Lola Run soundtrack, with her song Somebody Has To Pay.
