= Deadly Maria =

1993 German film

- Directed by: Tom Tykwer
- Written by: Tom Tykwer
- Produced by: Stefan Arndt; Tom Tykwer
- Starring: Nina Petri; Katja Studt; Josef Bierbichler
- Cinematography: Frank Griebe
- Edited by: Katja Dringenberg
- Release date: 1993
- Running time: 106 minutes
- Country: Germany
- Language: German

Deadly Maria (German: Die tödliche Maria), is a 1993 German film directed by Tom Tykwer.

== Cast ==
- Nina Petri as Maria
- Katja Studt as Maria (age 16)
- Juliane Heinemann as Maria (age 10)
- Josef Bierbichler as Maria's father
- Peter Franke as Heinz
- Joachim Król as Dieter
