= This Is Congo =

2017 documentary film

- Directed by: Daniel McCabe
- Produced by: Geoff McLean; Daniel McCabe; Alyse Ardell Spiegel
- Edited by: Alyse Ardell Spiegel
- Music by: Johnny Klimek; Gabriel Mounsey
- Production companies: Turbo/Vision Film Company; T-Dog Productions; Sabotage Films; Thought Engine
- Distributed by: Dogwoof
- Release date: September 1, 2017 (Venice Film Festival)
- Running time: 92 minutes
- Country: United States
- Languages: English, French, Swahili, Lingala

This Is Congo is a 2017 documentary film by American filmmaker and photographer Daniel McCabe. It was distributed by Dogwoof and produced by Turbo/Vision Film Company, T-Dog Productions, Sabotage Films and Thought Engine. The film features a voice over by Ivorian actor Isaach de Bankolé. It premiered at the Venice Film Festival as an out of competition title, and had a screening at TIFF Bell Lightbox in April 2018.

== Reception ==
This Is Congo received positive reviews from film critics. Cath Clarke of The Guardian rated it 3 stars out of 5, saying it is "a long read about the humanitarian crisis in the Democratic Republic of the Congo". Clarke also said its potted history will "frustrate experts as superficial". In a review for The New York Times, Ben Kenigsberg said the film provides a lot to admire and that the "sheer scope of the subject matter might be even better served by the capaciousness of a mini-series". Los Angeles Times writer Gary Goldstein described it as "vivid" and "immersive", noting its characters "provide a haunting window into a deeply anarchic world too-rarely glimpsed". Guy Lodge of Variety magazine said the film "excels when trading in details that can't be more substantively gleaned from written history and journalism."

Boyd Hoeij of The Hollywood Reporter applauded the film's combat scenes, but criticized McCabe for "omitting things that are equally important for an understanding of the Kivu Conflict". Ed Potton of The Sunday Times awarded the film 3 stars out of 5, describing it as "hard-hitting and often harrowing". The New Yorker's Peter Canby said the film "covers a specific episode of the country's more general violence". In addition, Canby highlighted the character Colonel Ndala as the standout among the four characters. In a review for Point of View magazine, Pat Mullen said the film "works viscerally and has a great impact at an emotional level" and that McCabe "implores audiences to bear witness to crimes to which previous generations turned a blind eye". Alan Scherstuhl of The Village Voice described the film's footage as "harrowing, raw and intimate".

The Financial Times writer Nigel Andrews granted the film 3 stars out of 5, saying McCabe's multiple portraiture "enthral". L. Kent Wolgamott of Lincoln Journal Star said the film tells the war-torn story of the DRC through "the testimony of four people, vintage news clips and raw, riveting footage from the battlefields and displaced person camps". In The London Economic, journalist Wyndham Hacket Pain opined that although the documentary "may tell a story that is familiar from new reports and articles, it has rarely been told in such a meditative and poetic manner." David D'Arcy of Screen Daily commended McCabe for presenting the DRC story with a "grim element of surprise", but ended up saying the documentary's multiple perspectives "can feel lopsided". Reviewing for International Policy Digest, David Ferguson said This Is Congo was "beautifully photographed, and perfectly captures the often stunning landscape between violent bursts of war and personal fright".

== Accolades ==
Award	Category	Recipients and nominees	Outcome	Ref
Global Cinema Film Festival	Best Film Editing	This Is Congo	Won	
