= Perfume: The Story of a Murderer (film) =

- Theatrical release poster
- Directed by: Tom Tykwer
- Screenplay by: Andrew Birkin; Bernd Eichinger; Tom Tykwer
- Based on: Perfume: The Story of a Murderer by Patrick Süskind
- Produced by: Bernd Eichinger
- Starring: Ben Whishaw; Alan Rickman; Rachel Hurd-Wood; Dustin Hoffman
- Narrated by: John Hurt (English); Otto Sander (German); Jacques Perrin (French); Manolo García (Castilian Spanish)
- Cinematography: Frank Griebe
- Edited by: Alexander Berner
- Music by: Tom Tykwer; Johnny Klimek; Reinhold Heil
- Production companies: Constantin Film; VIP Medienfonds 4; Nouvelles Editions de Films; Castelao Productions
- Distributed by: DreamWorks Pictures (through Paramount Pictures; United States and Canada); Constantin Film Verleih (Germany); Metropolitan Filmexport (France); Filmax (Spain); Summit Entertainment (International)
- Release dates: September 14, 2006 (Germany); October 4, 2006 (France); November 24, 2006 (Spain); December 27, 2006 (United States)
- Running time: 147 minutes
- Countries: Germany; France; Spain; United States
- Language: English
- Budget: $60 million
- Box office: $135 million

Perfume: The Story of a Murderer is a 2006 period psychological thriller film directed by Tom Tykwer, who cowrote the screenplay with Andrew Birkin and Bernd Eichinger, based on the 1985 novel of the same name by Patrick Süskind. The film stars Ben Whishaw, Alan Rickman, Rachel Hurd-Wood and Dustin Hoffman. Set in 18th-century France, the film tells the story of Jean-Baptiste Grenouille (Whishaw), an olfactory genius, and his homicidal quest for the perfect scent.

Producer Eichinger bought the film rights to Süskind's novel in 2000, and began writing the screenplay together with Birkin. Tykwer was selected as the director, and joined the two in developing the screenplay in 2003. Principal photography began July 12, 2005, and concluded October 16, 2005. Filming took place in Spain, Germany and France. The film was made on a budget of €50 million (est. $60 million), making it one of the most expensive German films.

A co-production of Germany, France, Spain and the United States, Perfume was released September 14, 2006, in Germany by Constantin Film, December 26, 2006, in the United Kingdom by Pathé Distribution, and December 27, 2006, in the United States by DreamWorks Pictures. It grossed more than $135 million worldwide, of which more than $53 million was made in Germany. Critics gave the film mixed reviews. The visual style and performances of Rickman and Whishaw were predominantly praised, while the unevenness of the screenplay and casting of Hoffman were criticized.

== Plot ==
The film begins with the sentencing of Jean-Baptiste Grenouille, a notorious murderer, with an angry mob demanding he be killed. The story of his life is told in flashback.

His mother gives birth to him in a French fish market; believing he is stillborn like her previous children, she abandons him on the ground. When people hear Grenouille cry, they accuse his mother of being a murderer and she is almost immediately hanged. Raised in an orphanage, Grenouille grows into a strangely detached boy with a superhuman sense of smell. After growing to maturity as a tanner's apprentice, he makes his first delivery to Paris, where he revels in all the new scents. He is particularly enchanted by a redheaded girl selling yellow plums, following her and attempting to sniff her, but he startles her with his behavior. To prevent her from crying out, he covers her mouth and unintentionally suffocates her. After realizing she is dead, he strips her naked and smells her all over, becoming distraught when her scent fades. Afterward, he is haunted by the desire to recreate her aroma.

When making a delivery to a perfume shop, Grenouille amazes the Italian owner, Giuseppe Baldini, with his ability to create fragrances, even though he doesn't know the scent names or methods to make perfume. He revitalizes the perfumer's career with new formulas, demanding that Baldini teach him how to preserve scents. Baldini explains that all perfumes are harmonies of twelve scents, and may contain a theoretical thirteenth scent.

Grenouille is sickened to learn that Baldini's method of distillation will not capture the scents of all objects and animals (or rather, people). Baldini informs Grenouille of another method in Grasse, and provides him the journeyman papers in exchange for 100 new perfume formulas. Immediately after Grenouille departs, however, Baldini dies when his shaky apartment building collapses with him in it. En route to Grasse, Grenouille decides to exile himself from society, taking refuge in a cave. During this time, he discovers that he himself lacks any personal scent, and he believes this is why he is perceived as strange or disturbing by others. He wishes to find a way to leave an impression as the plum seller did to him; deciding to continue his quest, he leaves the cave.

On arrival in Grasse, he catches the scent of Laure Richis, the redheaded daughter of the wealthy Antoine Richis, and decides that she will be his "thirteenth scent", the linchpin of his perfume. He finds a job and learns the method of enfleurage. He starts experimenting by first killing a young woman and attempting to extract her scent using hot enfleurage, which fails. He attempts cold enfleurage on a prostitute he murders, and successfully preserves her scent. He tests her scent by putting it on his hand and causes her dog to come to him like they would for their owner.

Having perfected his method, he embarks on a killing spree, targeting young women and capturing their scents. He dumps their naked corpses around the city, creating panic. Although the town puts in a curfew and arms the men, he is still not discovered. After preserving the first twelve scents, he plans his attack on Laure. Although a different man has confessed to the crime under torture, Richis doesn't believe it and flees the city with her. Grenouille tracks her scent to a seaside inn and murders her and captures her scent while Richis is asleep.

Soldiers capture Grenouille moments after he finishes preparing his perfume. On the day of his execution, he applies the perfume on himself. The executioner and the crowd are speechless at the intoxicating scent; they declare Grenouille innocent and an angel before falling into a massive orgy. Richis approaches him with his sword, but is overwhelmed by the scent and embraces Grenouille as his son. When the crowd awakes from the spell, they refuse to believe what happened and sentence Grenouille's landlord instead as evidence was found on his property.

Walking out of Grasse unscathed, Grenouille has enough perfume to rule the world, but has discovered that it cannot help him to love nor be loved like a normal person. Disenchanted by his aimless quest, he returns to his birthplace and pours the remaining perfume over his head. Overwhelmed by the scent, the nearby crowd pile onto him and he is never seen again. The next morning, all that is left are his clothes and the perfume bottle, out of which one final drop falls.

== Cast ==
- Ben Whishaw as Jean-Baptiste Grenouille
- Alan Rickman as Antoine Richis
- Rachel Hurd-Wood as Laure Richis
- Dustin Hoffman as Giuseppe Baldini
- Sian Thomas as Madame Gaillard
- Corinna Harfouch as Madame Arnulfi
- Sam Douglas as Grimal
- Birgit Minichmayr as Grenouille's mother
- Karoline Herfurth as redheaded girl selling plums
- Dora Romano as Baldini's wife
- Carlos Gramaje as Police Lieutenant
- David Calder as Bishop of Grasse
- Jessica Schwarz as Natalie
- Joanna Griffiths as Marianne
- Sara Forestier as Jeanne
- Timothy Davies as Chenier
- Paul Berrondo as Druot
- John Hurt as the narrator (English version)
- Otto Sander as the narrator (German version)
- Jacques Perrin as the narrator (French version)
- Manolo García as the narrator (Castilian Spanish version)

== Production ==
=== Development ===
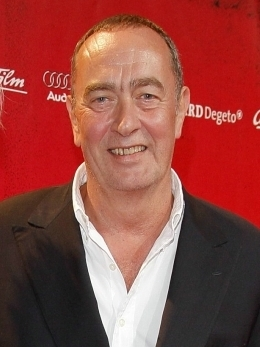
Producer Bernd Eichinger was denied the rights to the film when he first tried to obtain them in 1985.

Perfume: The Story of a Murderer is based on the 1985 novel by Patrick Süskind, which has sold over 20 million copies worldwide. Süskind reportedly thought that only Stanley Kubrick and Miloš Forman could do the book justice, and refused to let anyone else adapt it to film. Bernd Eichinger, the film's producer, read the novel when it was first released, and immediately approached Süskind (who was also a friend) to obtain the film rights; Süskind refused. In 2000, Süskind relented and sold the rights to Eichinger. Eichinger had to take out a personal loan because the supervisory board of Constantin Film refused to approve the selling price. He is rumored to have paid €10 million for the film rights. The author had no involvement in the project. Artist-director Julian Schnabel wanted to direct a film version of the novel, and wrote a script based on the novel. However, Eichinger, who owned the rights to the novel at the time, disliked Schnabel's stream of consciousness-driven narrative of the story, and that project never materialized. Schnabel eventually transferred his approach to his Perfume script to his 2007 film, The Diving Bell and the Butterfly.

Eichinger and screenwriter Andrew Birkin began to write a draft script. Eichinger says that their biggest problem was a narrative one. "The main character doesn't express himself. A novelist can use narrative to compensate for this; that's not possible in film. An audience can usually only get a feeling for a character if the character speaks," said Eichinger. "With material like this it is especially important for a director to get involved in the script." Eichinger met a number of directors, but felt that only Tom Tykwer was really in tune with the material. In 2003, Tykwer was invited to join Eichinger and Birkin in adapting the novel. The screenplay went through more than 20 revisions to get to the final shooting script. The three writers worked hard to create a faithful adaptation that captured the atmosphere and climate of the novel, yet, at the same time, have a specific and individual perspective, in terms of the story and the main character. The screenplay omitted several aspects described in the novel, such as the wet nurses' initial rejection of the child, the rejection by Father Terrier, Grenouille's confinement in a cave for seven years during the Seven Years' War, his visions and illusions of scents while in the cave, his subsequent journey south of Paris claiming to have been imprisoned by bandits, and the Marquis de la Taillade-Espinasse taking Grenouille under his wing, where he is detoxified, washed, and shaved until he resembles a gentleman, and where he creates his own perfume that inspires admiration. Changes included the execution of Grenouille's mother; Grenouille doesn't kill a puppy but uses it to test the distilled scent of a prostitute whom he kills with a blow to the head before macerating her; and Grenouille's arrest takes place hours later, whereas in the book it occurs days later.

The film had a production budget of €50 million (US$63.7 million), making it one of the most expensive German film productions. The film was financed by Constantin Film, of which Eichinger was the former CEO, billionaire Gisela Oeri and VIP Medienfonds. Perfume was Oeri's first investment in a film, and she also served as a co-producer. The film received €200,000 in funding from the German Federal Film Board (FFA)'s German–French Agreement fund. Eurimages also granted the film €600,000 in co-production funding. The film received €400,000 in funding from the German Federal Film Board. The film received production funding of €1.6 million from FilmFernsehFonds Bayern, €1 million from the German Federal Film Board and €750,000 from Filmstiftung NRW. The film received distribution funding of €205,000 from FilmFernsehFonds Bayern, €180,000 from the German Federal Film Board and €150,000 from the Bavarian Bank Fund.

Andreas Schmid, CEO of VIP Medienfonds ("Medienfonds" is a German term for a type of closed investment fund) and one of the film's executive producers, was arrested in October 2005 on suspicion of fraud and tax evasion. The resulting investigation revealed some irregularities in the financing of Perfume, suggesting that some investors may have invested in the film as a vehicle for tax evasion (to acquire tax losses). According to documents Schmid filed to tax authorities, VIP invested €25 million into the film. However, according to Constantin Film's ledgers, VIP put up only €4.1 million. The remainder of the €25 million was banked to collect interest, secure bank guarantees, and to pay back investors their share of the film's revenue. Due to VIP's claim that the whole €25 million was used to produce the film, its investors were also able to write off their entire contribution against tax. Perfume also received €700,000 in state subsidies from Filmstiftung NRW, based on the €4.1 million figure. In November 2007, Schmid was found guilty of multiple counts of tax evasion and sentenced to six years in prison. He had already served more than two years in jail since his arrest.

=== Casting ===
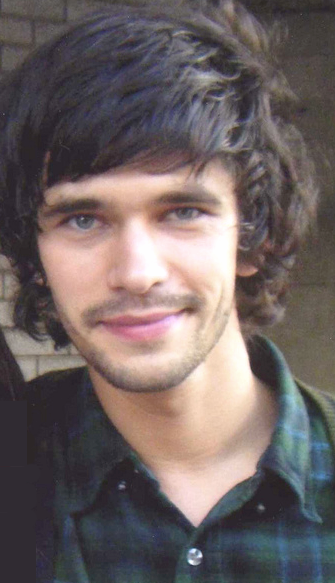
Ben Whishaw plays Jean-Baptiste Grenouille, a young man with an exceptionally powerful sense of smell.

Filming was originally planned to begin in the third quarter of 2004, but the filmmakers had trouble finding the right actor to play the protagonist, Grenouille. The search to find an actor to play Grenouille took nearly a year. On casting agent Michelle Guish's advice, Tykwer went to see Ben Whishaw perform as Hamlet in Trevor Nunn's production of the play. Tykwer immediately felt that he had found the actor for the role. An audition followed that convinced Eichinger of Whishaw's potential. Eichinger described Whishaw as embodying both "the innocent angel and the murderer". Regarding his search to find an actor, Tykwer said, "It only really seemed plausible to choose someone for this role who was completely unknown. You could also say a 'nobody' who is to become a 'somebody' - because that's what the story is about too."

When casting the role of Baldini, the washed-up perfumer who teaches Grenouille how to capture smells and create perfume, Tykwer immediately thought of Dustin Hoffman. "When I took on this project I knew straight away that there was no one who could play Baldini better," said Tykwer. Hoffman had wanted to work with Tykwer since he saw Run Lola Run, and Tykwer had always wanted to get Hoffman for a part. Hoffman and Whishaw had a week of rehearsal and a crash course in perfume-making prior to the start of principal photography. The scenes between the two actors were shot in sequence, allowing them to follow the natural progression of their characters' relationship.

Alan Rickman was Tykwer's first choice to play Richis, and the role was not offered to anyone else. Tykwer and Eichinger looked through hundreds of audition tapes to find the right actress for the role of Richis's daughter Laure. Tykwer believed he had found the right actress on a tape with 15 actresses, but couldn't remember exactly which was the one he liked. Eichinger looked through the tape and found what he thought was a suitable person. It turned out that both men had chosen the same actress, Rachel Hurd-Wood. Tykwer went to London to personally cast her. A new tape was recorded, and she was given the role. A suitable actress could not be found in England nor the United States for the role of the plum girl, so Tykwer decided to look at actresses in Germany. Karoline Herfurth, who had twice worked with Tykwer, was asked to do a screen test with Whishaw, in costume. Herfurth proved herself to Tykwer, and her role was expanded.

A total of 5,200 extras were used for the film, sometimes with nearly a thousand at once. The orgy scene at the film's climax required 750 extras. Fifty key players from the dance theater group La Fura dels Baus and 100 relatively experienced talents formed the core of the crowd. The remaining 600 extras were arranged around this group of 150 performers.

=== Design ===
To help define the film's look, the crew watched period films, such as Sleepy Hollow, Amadeus, Oliver Twist, Barry Lyndon, From Hell, The Elephant Man, Dracula, Brotherhood of the Wolf, Vidocq and Les Misérables. Cinematographer Frank Griebe said that of all the films they watched that had been shot on location, none really had the dirt and grit of the city that they desired for Perfume. "We needed a filthy city to get the real feel for the smells of it," said Griebe. Tykwer wanted to recreate 18th-century Paris, as seen through the eyes of the lower-class Grenouille, and said that he wanted to shoot the film "as if we were thrown into a time machine with a camera".

Tykwer described the film as having "a distinctly dark aesthetic" due to both the lack of adequate lighting during the film's period and the nature of its storyline. The filmmakers took inspiration from painters who specialized in darkness with few sources of light, including Caravaggio, Joseph Wright of Derby and Rembrandt. The film begins with a cool, monochromatic color palette, and as Grenouille discovers more scents, the palette warms and opens up. For the scenes in which Grenouille is in Paris for the first time, the filmmakers subtly added more powerful colors in the sets, costumes, props and lighting to represent Grenouille's experience of the new smells.

One of the main challenges of making the film was to convey the smells and the world of scents that Grenouille experiences. Tykwer said that, to him, Perfume "was much more a film about the importance of smell in our life than a film that tries to be smelly". The filmmakers strived to convey smell visually without the use of colors or special effects, Griebe said. "People see the fish market full of raw, bloody fish, and they know it stinks; they see a field of lavender and know it smells wonderful. We show Grenouille taking in smells by cupping his nose, and by doing close shots of his nose, and that's it!"

"Süskind's gift is in his ability to let his readers, through language, experience Grenouille's world, which is revealed solely through his sense of smell. We have done the same with a different language, one composed of sound, music, dialogue and, of course, image."

— Bernd Eichinger, producer

Pierre-Yves Gayraud, the film's costume designer, spent fifteen weeks researching 18th-century fashion. Production of more than 1,400 costumes, in addition to the preparation of shoes, hats and other accessories, was completed within three months by workshops in and around Bucharest, Romania. The costume department had to make the clothing look worn and dirty. Additionally, the actors were required to practically live in the costumes prior to shooting. The character of Grenouille was not given any white clothing, and wore bluish over-garments throughout most of the film because the filmmakers wanted to depict him as a shadow and a chameleon. Instead of dressing the character of Laure in the colorful regional dress that was the tradition of the time, she was dressed in the less vivid tones of a Parisian damsel to highlight her social aspirations, as well as her red hair.

=== Filming ===
Although the filmmakers needed an 18th-century French setting, shooting the film in its original setting of Paris was unlikely due to the extensive modernization of the city in the 19th century. Croatia was initially considered as an alternative because of its earthy scenery and pristine old-world towns, but although the price was right, the distance between locations proved to be disadvantageous. In the end, the filmmakers opted to shoot most of the film in Catalonia, Spain, which, although more expensive than Croatia, offered locations that were closer to each other.

Principal photography began July 12, 2005, and concluded October 16, 2005. The first fifteen days were spent entirely on the largest stage of Bavaria Film Studios in Munich, shooting the scenes between Baldini and Grenouille in the former's workshop. All the scenes with Hoffman were completed within the first eleven days.

Most of the remaining scenes were shot in Catalonia, Spain, specifically in Barcelona, Girona and Figueres. The streets of Barcelona stood in for those of Paris. El Barri Gòtic (the Gothic Quarter), part of Barcelona's historic town center, was converted into a Parisian fish market. Poble Espanyol, an open-air museum in Barcelona, was the location for the climactic orgy scene. To create an authentic dirty look, the film's crew included a "dirt unit" of about 60 people whose job was to distribute detritus over the city. Two and a half tons of fish and one ton of meat was dispersed in El Gòtic. Several mountain and forest scenes were shot in the environs of Girona. The city also provided the location of the home and studio of Madame Arnulfi. Sant Ferran Castle in Figueres provided the location for the tannery, the Paris city gates and the dungeon in which Grenouille is imprisoned. The cave in which Grenouille discovers he has no scent was also located in Figueres. Some landscape shots, including those used as Grasse's lavender fields, were filmed in Provence, France, in late June 2005, before principal photography started.

The cinematographer for Perfume was Frank Griebe, with whom Tykwer worked on all his films. The film was shot with Arri cameras and lenses. For sequences that required the camera to be extremely close to its subject, Griebe used the Kenworthy/Nettman Snorkel Lens System. Griebe shot the film on 3-perf Super 35 film using three Kodak Vision2 film stocks: 500T 5218, 200T 5217 and 100T 5212. 5218 was used for all the night scenes, and the choice between the other two was determined by weather conditions; 5212 when it was very sunny and 5217 whenever it was overcast. Tykwer and Griebe originally discussed shooting Perfume in the traditional Academy 1.33:1 aspect ratio, but they decided against it because of the difficulty of theatrical exhibition. "We felt 1.33:1 was perfect for many aspects of this story, but today you can't release a 1.33 film in theaters," said Griebe.

=== Post-production ===
Post-production took place in Munich and required nine months to complete, concluding in the third quarter of 2006. Film editor Alex Berner was present at all the shooting locations, and was on set with Tykwer. Berner also cut dailies as filming progressed that, according to Tykwer, saved a lot of time later. Tykwer said they had to work this way due to the film's tight schedule (the European release dates had already been locked). On every night of filming, Tykwer and Griebe would take screenshots from the dailies, and make notes for the film laboratory regarding what type of tone and palette they wanted, as well as the level of brightness and contrast they wanted for the prints.

A digital intermediate was used for the film. Approximately three months were spent grading the film. Digital grading tools were used to improve the color of the lavender fields, because the film crew had arrived a week early and the flowers were not in full bloom. In the scene in which Grenouille murders the plum girl, selective coloring was used to take the tone of the dead body's flesh from its natural color to a pale white.

Work on visual effects, of which there were approximately 250 shots, was carried out by Universal Production Partners in Prague. Much of the visual effects work for the film consisted of minor CGI corrections, such as wire removals, as well as several crowd manipulation and set extensions. Scale models were used to create the shots of the Seine river bridge with houses on it.

=== Music ===
Besides directing the film, Tykwer also composed the score with friends Johnny Klimek and Reinhold Heil, in their fourth consecutive collaboration since Winter Sleepers (1997). The score was performed by the Berlin Philharmonic and State choir Latvija, conducted by Simon Rattle. EMI Classics and Angel Records released the soundtrack on December 5, 2006.

== Release ==
=== Marketing ===
To coincide with the film's release, clothing and fragrance company Thierry Mugler released a fifteen-piece perfume coffret. The perfumes were a collaboration between Thierry Mugler's Vera Struebi and Pierre Aulas and International Flavors & Fragrances's Christophe Laudamiel and Christoph Hornetz. Laudamiel read the novel in 1994, and began recreating odors from it in 2000; Hornetz joined the project in 2002. Fourteen of the fragrances were inspired by the novel and film, while the fifteenth works as a fragrance enhancer but can also be worn on its own. Smells represented by the perfumes include Paris in 1738, a virgin's navel, a clean baby and leather. The coffret was released as a limited edition of 1,300 sets that sold for US$700 each; all 1,300 sets were sold.

=== Box office ===
The film was a financial success, especially in Europe, earning $135,039,943 worldwide. It opened in Germany September 14, 2006, and was number one on the box-office charts in its first three weeks. The film made $9.7 million in its opening weekend, and an estimated 1.04 million people in Germany saw the film in its first four days of release. The film ended up selling over five million tickets and grossing $53,125,663, the highest German gross for a dramatic film. The film's strong performance in Germany was attributed in part to a large marketing campaign and numerous premieres throughout the country.

By comparison, the film performed poorly in North America. The film had a three-theater limited release December 27, 2006, before expanding to 280 theaters January 5, 2007. The film completed its theatrical run in North America March 1, 2007, taking in a modest $2,223,293 overall. Roger Ebert attributed its poor U.S. box-office performance to the film "getting lost in the Christmas rush".

=== Home media ===
The film was released on DVD (in three configurations) and HD DVD in Germany by Highlight March 15, 2007. The standard-edition DVD and the HD DVD contain the film and three audio commentary tracks: one by Tykwer, one by production designer Uli Hanisch and his assistant Kai Karla Koch, and one by Griebe and editor Alexander Berner. The two-disc special-edition DVD's extra features include the same audio commentary tracks as on the standard edition, a "making-of" documentary, interviews with the cast and crew, and six featurettes. The DVD was also released in a numbered, limited-edition "Fascination of Smell" configuration that came in a wooden box containing five small bottles of the Thierry Mugler perfumes, in addition to the same material as the special-edition DVD. Only 7,777 units were available, and it was sold exclusively by Müller. A Blu-ray release of the film, which contains the same extra features as the special-edition DVD, was issued November 8, 2007. The DVD sold 300,000 units in Germany in its first 14 days of release, and sold 600,000 units by May 22, 2007. By May 15, 2009, 1.15 million DVD and Blu-ray units of the film had been sold in the country. In the United States, 387,520 DVD units have been sold as of the latest figures, translating to $7,547,755 in revenue.

== Reception ==
=== Critical response ===
As of January 2024, on Rotten Tomatoes, the film had a 59% approval rating, based on 131 reviews, with an average rating of 6.2/10. The website's consensus reads: "Perfume is what you'd expect from a Tom-Twyker[sic]-directed movie glamorizing a serial killer: A kinetic visual feast, with a dark antihero that's impossible to feel sympathy for." On Metacritic, the film had a weighted average score of 56 out of 100, based on 30 reviews, indicating "mixed or average reviews".

The Hollywood Reporter's Bernard Besserglik described the film as a "visually lush, fast-moving story", stating that the director "has a sure sense of spectacle and, despite its faults, the movie maintains its queasy grip".

Dan Jolin of Empire gave the film four stars out of five, and said, "The odd conclusion renders it somewhat oblique, but Perfume is a feast for the senses. Smell it with your eyes..."

A. O. Scott of The New York Times gave the film a negative review, saying, "Try as it might to be refined and provocative, Perfume: The Story of a Murderer never rises above the pedestrian creepiness of its conceit." Scott also said that Whishaw "does not quite manage to make Grenouille either a victim worthy of pity or a fascinating monster. [...] In the film he comes across as dull, dour and repellent."

James Berardinelli of Reelviews.net gave the film two and a half stars out of four, saying, "There's a mesmerizing appeal to the director's in-your-face style, even if the images he displays are often repugnant. Unfortunately, Tykwer is working with a flawed screenplay and even the most arresting visuals cannot compensate for the movie's schizophrenic story."

Roger Ebert of the Chicago Sun-Times was very enthusiastic, giving the film four stars out of four, and wrote, "It took imagination to tell it, courage to film it, thought to act it, and from the audience it requires a brave curiosity about the peculiarity of obsession." Ebert included it on his list of best films of the year, and named Perfume as "the most underappreciated movie of the year".

Boyd van Hoeij of European-Films.net said, "Tykwer's sane decision to prefer traditional craftsmanship over computer-generated imagery and a highly intelligent screenplay that hews very close to the spirit of the novel put Perfume way ahead of its competitors." Van Hoeij later named Perfume: The Story of a Murderer one of the ten best films of 2006.

Variety's Derek Elley said that the film was an "extremely faithful" adaptation, but felt that it was slightly too long, and "more liberties should have been taken to make the novel work on the screen".

Reviews of the cast were mixed. Whishaw's performance was praised by many critics. Boyd van Hoeij said Whishaw was "a revelation in a very difficult role that is mostly mute and certainly ugly". The San Francisco Chronicle's Mick LaSalle said, "Whishaw succeeds in making the repulsive protagonist thoroughly repulsive, which is probably a testimony to his acting ability." The casting of Dustin Hoffman as Baldini was criticized by several reviewers. The Los Angeles Times's Carina Chocano called his performance "disconcertingly kitsch and over the top". Conversely, Rickman's performance as Richis was well received.

=== Accolades ===
Perfume: The Story of a Murderer was nominated for five Saturn Awards at the 33rd Saturn Awards: Best Action/Adventure/Thriller Film, Best Director (Tykwer), Best Writing (Birkin, Eichinger, Tykwer), Best Supporting Actress (Hurd-Wood), and Best Music (Tykwer, Klimek, Heil). At the 2007 European Film Awards, Frank Griebe won the award for Best Cinematographer, and Uli Hanisch won the European Film Academy Prix d'Excellence for his production design work. The film also received nominations from the People's Choice Awards for Best Actor (Ben Whishaw) and Best Composer (Tykwer, Klimek, Heil). At the 2007 German Film Awards, the film won the Silver Best Feature Film award, and the awards for Best Cinematography, Best Costume Design, Best Editing, Best Production Design and Best Sound. It also received nominations for Best Direction and Best Film Score. At the 2007 Bavarian Film Awards, Tykwer and Hanisch won awards for Best Director and Best Production Design, respectively. Eichinger, Tykwer and Whishaw received the award for their work on Perfume, which won the 2006 Bambi Award in the Film – National category.

== See also ==
- Cinema of Germany
- List of films based on crime books
