= Reinhold Heil =

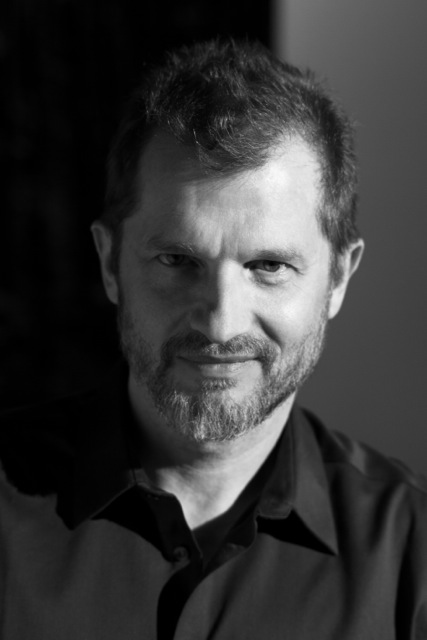
- Heil in 2015

Background information
- Born: 18 May 1954 (age 72); Schlüchtern, Hesse, West Germany (present-day Germany)
- Occupations: Musician, film composer, music producer
- Years active: 1974–present
- Member of: Tom Tykwer; Johnny Klimek
- Formerly of: Nina Hagen Band; Spliff; Nena

Reinhold Heil (born 18 May 1954) is a German musician, producer, and film and television composer. He initially achieved success in Germany as a member of the post-punk and Neue Deutsche Welle groups Nina Hagen Band, Spliff and Nena, and later as a music producer.

As a film composer, he is known for his collaborations with director Tom Tykwer, on films such as Run Lola Run (1998), Perfume: The Story of a Murderer (2006), The International (2009), and Cloud Atlas (2012). His television credits include the series Deadwood (2004–06). He often works with Australian composer Johnny Klimek.

== Early life ==
Heil was born in Schlüchtern, in the state of Hesse, West Germany. He grew up twenty meters from Schlüchtern's 10th century monastery, where he was introduced to classical music. Heil learned to play church organ at a young age and in adolescence began training to become a pianist. In his teenage years, Heil's father, who owned the town's only record and hi-fi store, put Heil in charge of selecting all the records sold in his store, inadvertently giving Heil access to the most influential pop music of the times. Heil eagerly immersed himself in rock, soul, jazz, and electronic music.

After graduating from high school in the mid-1970s, Heil left Schlüchtern for West Berlin. At the time, West Berlin was an island of western culture isolated in the middle of communist East Germany and a fertile breeding ground for experimentation and artistic and political self-expression.

While a student at the Berlin Music Academy, Heil supplemented his studies of classical music with studies in musique concrète and early electronic music. He was deeply influenced by pioneering jazz and rock musicians such as Miles Davis and Frank Zappa.

== Rock music career ==
In 1977, Heil met a dissident artist from communist East Germany, the young Nina Hagen, who was electrifying Berlin's punk world with her powerful operatic voice and genre-defying musical style. Hagen asked Heil to join her band as her keyboardist, co-writer and co-producer and for the next few years Heil honed his craft what became the legendary Nina Hagen Band.

After Hagen left the group to pursue a solo career, the remaining band members formed Spliff, one of Germany's most successful rock bands of the 1980s. In the 1980s and 1990s, Heil was widely regarded as one of the best keyboardists in Europe. He is also known as the producer of German Neue Deutsche Welle band Nena's albums and singles, including the hit songs "99 Luftballons" (1983) and "Irgendwie, irgendwo, irgendwann" (1984).

== Film composing career ==
In 1994, Heil became friends with Australian expat and bass player Johnny Klimek, a producer of Berlin underground techno DJs. What began as a casual partnership producing trip hop tunes in a Berlin studio, led Heil and Klimek to collaborating with German director Tom Tykwer on scoring Tykwer's second feature, Winter Sleepers. Two years later, the trio scored Tykwer's breakthrough hit, Run Lola Run and all Tykwer's subsequent films through Cloud Atlas (with the exception of Heaven in 2002).

Heil moved to California in 1997 and Klimek followed him three years later. The international success of Run Lola Run, which came out in the US in 1999, got Hollywood's attention. Run Lola Run's soundtrack album sold half a million copies worldwide, with 50% of those sales occurring in the US. These were huge numbers for a soundtrack album, let alone a subtitled German-language movie. Run Lola Run was the first film to have a techno score that was not composed of pre-existing music, but was scored directly to picture.

Heil and Klimek continued their film scoring collaboration for a dozen years on such varied projects as One Hour Photo, The International, Perfume: The Story of a Murderer, HBO's Deadwood, CBS's Without a Trace, NBC's Awake and the epic adventure drama Cloud Atlas, based on a best selling novel by David Mitchell, directed by The Wachowskis and Tom Tykwer. The score for Cloud Atlas was nominated in 2013 for a Golden Globe award.

In 2011, Heil and Klimek ended their musical partnership though they continued to collaborate on selected projects, most notably for director Tom Tykwer on Cloud Atlas (2012) and director Stuart Beattie's feature, I, Frankenstein (2014).

Heil's distinctive musical signature is characterized by harmonic complexity, unusual chord progressions, and juxtapositions of organic and electronic sounds, which he creates using his collection of obscure musical instruments, as well as utilising both modern and vintage computer software.

In 2016, Heil was awarded the Adolf Grimme Award for his exceptional original music score to the RTL and Sundance TV produced television series Deutschland 83.

Heil is represented by Fortress Talent Management.

== Filmography ==
- Berlin Station (Epix) (2016)
- Deutschland 83 (Sundance TV) (2015)
- Legends (TNT) (2014)
- Helix (Syfy) (2014)
- I, Frankenstein (2014)
- Haunt (2013)
- Cloud Atlas (Nominated for Golden Globe Award for Best Original Score) (2012)
- Awake (NBC) (2012)
- Locke & Key (TV Pilot, Fox) (2011)
- 6 giorni sulla Terra (2011)
- Killer Elite (2011)
- Happiness Runs (2010)
- Three (2010)
- Tomorrow When the War Began (2010)
- The International (2009)
- Perfume: The Story of a Murderer (Nominated for Saturn Award for Best Music and German Film Awards, Film Award in Gold for Best Film Score) (2006)
- John From Cincinnati (HBO) (2007)
- Anamorph (2007)
- Blood and Chocolate (2007)
- Deadwood (HBO) (2006)
- Paris, je t'aime (2006)
- Land of the Dead (2005)
- The Cave (2005)
- Sophie Scholl: The Final Days (2005)
- Iron Jawed Angels (HBO) (2004)
- Without A Trace (CBS) (2002)
- One Hour Photo (Nominated for Saturn Award for Best Music) (2002)
- The Princess and the Warrior (2000)
- Run Lola Run (Nominated for Chicago Film Critics Association award for Best Original Score) (1999)
- Winter Sleepers (1997)
