= The International (2009 film) =

2009 action thriller film

- Theatrical poster
- Directed by: Tom Tykwer
- Written by: Eric Warren Singer
- Produced by: Charles Roven; Richard Suckle; Lloyd Phillips
- Starring: Clive Owen; Naomi Watts; Armin Mueller-Stahl; Brían F. O'Byrne
- Cinematography: Frank Griebe
- Edited by: Mathilde Bonnefoy
- Music by: Tom Tykwer; Reinhold Heil; Johnny Klimek; Matt Bellamy
- Production companies: Columbia Pictures; Atlas Entertainment
- Distributed by: Sony Pictures Releasing
- Release dates: 12 February 2009 (Germany); 13 February 2009 (United States)
- Running time: 118 minutes
- Countries: United States; Germany
- Languages: Italian; English
- Budget: $50 million
- Box office: $60.2 million

The International is a 2009 action thriller film directed by Tom Tykwer and written by Eric Warren Singer. Starring Clive Owen and Naomi Watts, the film follows an Interpol agent and an American district attorney who jointly investigate corruption within the IBBC, a fictional merchant bank based in Luxembourg. It serves organized crime and corrupt governments as a banker and as an arms broker. The bank's ruthless managers assassinate potential threats, including their own employees.

Inspired by the Bank of Credit and Commerce International (BCCI) scandal of the 1980s, the film raises concerns about how global finance affects international politics across the world. Production began in Berlin in September 2007, including the construction of a life-size replica of New York's Guggenheim Museum for the film's central shootout scene.

The International opened the 59th Berlin International Film Festival on 5 February 2009, and was released in Germany on 12 February and in the United States the following day. It received mixed reviews from critics, with the Rotten Tomatoes critical consensus being "The International boasts some electric action sequences and picturesque locales, but is undone by its preposterous plot". The film grossed $60 million on a budget of $50M.

== Plot ==
An investigator from New York, Thomas Schumer, meets with an executive of the International Bank of Business and Credit (IBBC) in the parking lot of the Berlin Hauptbahnhof Station. Schumer asks why IBBC is buying $200 million of missile guidance systems from Calvini Defense, an arms manufacturer. Immediately after walking across the parking lot to meet agent Louis Salinger of Interpol, Schumer dies of an apparent heart attack. Salinger finds a puncture wound on Schumer’s neck, indicating he might have been poisoned.

Salinger and Eleanor Whitman, an Assistant District Attorney from Manhattan, are investigating the IBBC, which they believe funds criminal activities such as money laundering, terrorism, arms trading and the destabilization of governments.

Salinger's and Whitman's investigation takes them to Milan, where IBBC arranges the assassination of Umberto Calvini, owner of Calvini Defense and an Italian prime ministerial candidate. The assassin diverts suspicion to a local with political connections to the Red Brigades, who is quickly killed by a corrupt policeman. Salinger and Whitman get a lead on the real assassin, but the policeman confronts them and orders them out of the country. At the airport, Salinger and Whitman check the security camera footage for clues to Calvini's assassin, and follow a suspect to New York City.

Jonas Skarssen, the chairman of IBBC, explains that Calvini was killed so IBBC could negotiate with his sons, who in the past were more willing to do the missile guidance deal. Since IBBC believes that Salinger and Whitman are close to finding the assassin, it sends a team of hitmen to kill him.

In New York, Salinger and Whitman meet with New York City Police Department detectives, Iggy Ornelas and Bernie Ward, who have a photograph of the assassin. Salinger, Ornelas and Ward locate the doctor whose practice made the assassin's leg brace. The three find the assassin and follow him to the Solomon R. Guggenheim Museum. As Salinger and Ward attempt to arrest the assassin, a massive shootout erupts at the Guggenheim when the team of gunmen attack them. Ward is killed, and Salinger is forced to team up with the assassin to fight off the gunmen. However, the assassin is mortally wounded during their escape and dies of his injuries.

Ornelas followed Wilhelm Wexler, IBBC’s security advisor who is the liaison with the assassin, and arrested him away from the museum. When Salinger interrogates Wexler, a veteran Stasi officer, Wexler asserts that IBBC is practically untouchable due to its connections to terrorist organizations, drug cartels, governments and powerful corporations. Nonetheless, Wexler indicates a willingness to help Salinger take down IBBC. Salinger persuades Whitman to let him continue alone so she can have plausible deniability of anything he may do.

In Italy, Salinger informs Calvini's sons of IBBC's responsibility for their father's murder, prompting them to cancel the deal with the bank and have the IBBC’s legal counsel, who is there to close the deal, killed. Salinger meets Wexler in Istanbul, where Skarssen is buying the guidance systems from their only other manufacturer, Ahmet Sunay. Salinger attempts to secretly record the conversation between Skarssen and Sunay so that he can stop the deal, but fails. First Wexler and then Skarssen are killed by a hitman contracted by the Calvini's to avenge their father's murder. Salinger is left stunned.

Afterwards, IBBC successfully continues its operations despite the death of Skarssen. Eventually, the bank's aggressive expansion under its new chairman leads to greater scrutiny in a United States Senate investigation, headed by Whitman.

== Cast ==
- Clive Owen as Louis Salinger
- Naomi Watts as Eleanor Whitman
- Armin Mueller-Stahl as Wilhelm Wexler
- Ulrich Thomsen as Jonas Skarssen
- Brían F. O'Byrne as "The Consultant", the bank's assassin
- Jack McGee as Detective Bernie Ward
- Felix Solis as Detective Iggy Ornelas
- Nilaja Sun as Detective Gloria Hubbard
- Haluk Bilginer as Ahmet Sunay
- James Rebhorn as New York D.A.
- Alessandro Fabrizi as Inspector Alberto Cerutti
- Luca Barbareschi as Umberto Calvini
- Patrick Baladi as Martin White
- Jay Villiers as Francis Ehames
- Michel Voletti as Viktor Haas
- Fabrice Scott as Nicolai Yeshinski
- Axel Milberg as Klaus Diemer
- Steven Randazzo as Al Moody
- Tibor Feldman as Dr. Isaacson
- Remy Auberjonois as Sam Purvitz
- Ian Burfield as Thomas Schumer
- Ben Whishaw as Rene Antall

== Production ==
The screenplay was written by Eric Warren Singer after he developed an interest in the banking scandals from the 1980s and 90s. He was looking for "a paranoid thriller vibe" from that period; "The Godfather III was really the only film up to this point that dealt with the banking scandals, because it was really gangster warfare on a corporate level, and I thought that was the best part of the film." Later reviewers compared it directly to The Parallax View (1974) and All the President's Men (1976). A year later Tom Tykwer got involved through his agent, but decided a contemporary setting would work better. In April 2007, Clive Owen agreed to perform in The International. He said the script interested him because he was reminded of "those '70s paranoia pictures" and because it combined a factual, intelligent basis with an international thriller plot. The following July, actress Naomi Watts was cast opposite Owen. In August, the film received US$5.4 million from the German Federal Film Fund toward its budget. The following month its funding increased to $7.9 million, based on the board's assessment that two-thirds of The International would be produced in Germany and that a number of Germans were in important roles, such as actors Armin Mueller-Stahl and Axel Milberg, cinematographer Frank Griebe, and production designer Uli Hanisch. Filming began in Berlin on 10 September 2007. Part of the production took place in Babelsberg Studios.

Clive Owen called the shoot-out scene "one of the most exquisitely executed sequences I've been involved in". Tom Tykwer planned the scene in detail and toured the museum with the principals months in advance. The lobby entrance scene was filmed in the Solomon R. Guggenheim Museum in New York, but for the shooting sequences a 118-foot (36 m) wide, life-size replica, including an audio visual exhibition with works of Julian Rosefeldt, was built in Germany. This set was too large for the studio, so it was instead built in a disused locomotive warehouse outside Berlin; its construction took ten weeks. Having filmed in the real museum interior and on the sound stage in Germany, the film crew had to track the lights and camera angles carefully throughout to ensure continuity. The scene includes a sequence in which the protagonist sends a huge art-chandelier hanging from the ceiling crashing to the ground; the entire stunt was created using computer generated imagery.

== Themes ==
Clive Owen, discussing the film's relevance, said it "ultimately does ask questions about whether banks use people's money appropriately, and if they're completely sound institutions." More boldly put, Philip French, reviewing the film in The Observer, surmised the sentiment as "Let's kill all the bankers", a modern-day version of Dick the Butcher's "First thing we do, let's kill all the lawyers", from Shakespeare's Henry VI, Part II. Salinger's (Owen) central revelation is that the world is governed by anonymous forces, staffed by disposable individuals. The powerlessness of the ordinary citizen is symbolised by the huge, impersonal buildings that the villains inhabit.

The film draws on a number of macabre incidents from international banking: the Bank of Credit and Commerce International crisis in 1991; the murder of Roberto Calvi, an alleged banker to the Sicilian Mafia, in London in 1982; and the assassination by poisoning of Georgi Markov in London, in 1978. The bank is making large loans to rogue states and simultaneously acting as their munitions broker. The script offers the chilling insight that the creditors are the real winners of any conflict. A. O. Scott commented on the opportunity to make a film critical of international finance, "that multinational weapons manufacturers can be portrayed as more decent, civic-minded and principled than global financiers surely says something about the state of the world."

== Home media ==
The International was released on DVD, Blu-ray and UMD Video on June 9, 2009, by Sony Pictures Home Entertainment.

== Reception ==
=== Box office ===
The International was first screened on 5 February 2009 at the 59th Berlin International Film Festival and was released in the United States and Canada on 13 February 2009. In a six-week run in America, it earned $25 million at the box office. It was released in Australia on 19 February and the United Kingdom on 27 February 2009. Its total theatrical earnings worldwide were $60,161,391.

It was released in France under the title "L'Enquête" ("The Investigation") on 11 March 2009, it earned €264,054 during a three-week theatrical release.

Reviewers called the film "topical" and "remarkably prescient", due to its release just after the 2008 financial crisis during the start of the Great Recession. The film was released on DVD and Blu-ray in the United States on 9 June 2009. It contains a digital copy for portable devices.

=== Critical reception ===
The film holds a 57% approval rating on Rotten Tomatoes based on 207 reviews and an average rating of 5.80/10. The consensus statement reads: "The International boasts some electric action sequences and picturesque locales, but is undone by its preposterous plot." Metacritic gives the film a 52% rating based on 34 reviews. Audiences polled by CinemaScore gave the film an average grade of "C+" on an A+ to F scale.

In his review for The Guardian, Peter Bradshaw wrote, "I felt occasionally that Owen's rumpled performance is in danger of becoming a little one-note ... but this is still an unexpectedly well–made thriller with brainpower as well as firepower". Philip French, in his review for The Observer, called the film a "slick, fast-moving conspiracy thriller" and the gunfight in the Guggenheim "spectacular". In his review for The Independent, Anthony Quinn wrote, "It's reasonably efficient, passably entertaining, and strenuously playing catch-up with the Bourne movies: flat-footed Owen doesn't look as good as Matt Damon sprinting through city streets, and the editing doesn't match Doug Liman's whiplash pace". The New Yorker magazine's David Denby wrote, "And there's a big hole in the middle of the movie: the director, Tom Tykwer, and the screenwriter, Eric Warren Singer, forgot to make their two crusaders human beings". A.O. Scott, in his review for The New York Times, wrote, "The International, in contrast, is so undistinguished that the moments you remember best are those that you wish another, more original director had tackled". In his review for the Los Angeles Times, Kenneth Turan wrote, "It's got some effective moments and aspects, but the film goes in and out of plausibility, and its elements never manage to unify into a coherent whole". Claudia Puig, in her review for USA Today, wrote, "The dialogue by screenwriter Eric Warren Singer is spotty. There are some great, pithy lines and others whose attempt at profundity ring false". Roger Ebert gave the film three out of four stars and wrote, "Clive Owen makes a semi-believable hero, not performing too many feats that are physically unlikely. He's handsome and has the obligatory macho stubble, but he has a quality that makes you worry a little about him". Entertainment Weekly gave the film a "B−" rating and Lisa Schwarzbaum wrote, "the star of the pic may well be NYC's Guggenheim Museum and Istanbul's Grand Bazaar, both of which figure in cool action chase sequences that pay handsome dividends".

The film earned an average rating of three stars from five from French critics according to AlloCiné. Reviewing the film for Le Monde, which gave the film one star, Jacques Mandelbaum said that the modern, destructive forces of political fantasy and derivative finance which power the film's plot should have created sparks, "but in reality, the film trudges along. While the film constituted a thrilling geographic tour of the genre tropes, it forgot to focus on characters and mood."
