= Johnny Klimek =

Australian musician

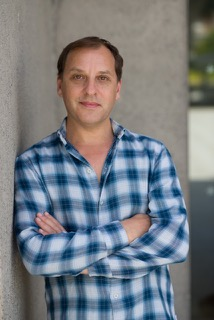

Background information
- Born: 18 August 1962 (age 63); Melbourne, Australia
- Genres: Film score, electronic
- Occupations: Musician, composer, record producer
- Instruments: Keyboards, synthesizer, guitar
- Years active: 1997–present

Johnny Klimek (born 18 August 1962) is an Australian musician, music producer, and composer, best known for his innovative work in the underground electronica music scene and for his film scores.

== Life and career ==
Klimek was born in Melbourne, Australia. His mother, Luisa née Cester (born 29 January 1916 in Pasiano di Pordenone) was a daughter of the couple Eugenia and Ernesto Cester. In the summer of 1940, she left Friuli-Venezia Giulia for Australia. After the Second World War, she married Alfons Klimek (died 1998) and gave birth to eight children: Eugenia, Lydia, Naomi (born 1953), Greta, Alfons junior, Robert, and twins Jayney and Johnny (born August 1962). Her sister, Fanny Cester, emigrated to Australia in 1937 and married racing cyclist Nino Borsari in 1940. The Klimek family lived in various Melbourne suburbs including Kew, Oakleigh and, from 1969, Clayton. Klimek's younger cousins, Nic and Chris Cester, were founding mainstays of Australian hard rocker band, Jet (2001–12).

Johnny worked in a number of local garage bands before emigrating to Berlin in 1983, where he started the pop rock band The Other Ones with his sister Jayney and brother Alf. He became active in the Berlin underground trance/ambient/techno scene, and collaborated with Paul Browse of the band Clock DVA on a short-lived musical project, Effective Force. He served as the bass player for singer Nina Hagen's 1996 tour.

Klimek has produced numerous film scores with composer Reinhold Heil, beginning with the 1997 film Winter Sleepers. Since then, they have become regular collaborators of its director, Tom Tykwer, and have provided the score to almost all of his films since, including the score to Perfume, Story Of A Murderer. Klimek, Heil, and Tykwer were nominated for a Golden Globe Award for Best Original Score for their critically acclaimed score to the latter's 2012 epic science fiction film Cloud Atlas. He has also worked on television series such as Without a Trace, Deadwood, The Newsroom, and Sense8, thriller films such as Run Lola Run and One Hour Photo, horror films such as Land of the Dead and Blood & Chocolate, and action films like Killer Elite and I, Frankenstein. He has won 5 ASCAP Awards, and has been nominated for 2 Saturn Awards, and for 1 Primetime Emmy Award.

== Filmography ==
=== Feature films ===
Year	Title	Director	Notes
1997	Winter Sleepers	Tom Tykwer	—N/a
1998	Run Lola Run	Tom Tykwer	—N/a
1999	Paradise Mall	Friedemann Fromm	—N/a
2000	Ants in the Pants	Marc Rothemund	—N/a
2000	The Princess and the Warrior	Tom Tykwer	—N/a
2000	Bundle of Joy	Detlev Buck	—N/a
2001	Tangled	Jay Lowi	—N/a
2002	One Hour Photo	Mark Romanek	—N/a
2002	Bang Bang You're Dead	Guy Ferland	—N/a
2003	Swimming Upstream	Russell Mulcahy	—N/a
2004	Iron Jawed Angels	Katja von Garnier	—N/a
2005	Sophie Scholl – The Final Days	Marc Rothemund	—N/a
2005	The Cave	Bruce Hunt	—N/a
2005	Land of the Dead	George A. Romero	—N/a
2005	Deck Dogz	Steve Pasvolsky	—N/a
2006	Perfume: The Story of a Murderer	Tom Tykwer	—N/a
2007	Blood & Chocolate	Katja von Garnier	—N/a
2007	Anamorph	Henry S. Miller	—N/a
2008	Blackout	Steve Pasvolsky	—N/a
2008	One Missed Call	Eric Valette	—N/a
2009	The International	Tom Tykwer	—N/a
2010	Stronger Than Blood	Oliver Kienle	—N/a
2010	Three	Tom Tykwer	—N/a
2010	Tomorrow, When the War Began	Stuart Beattie	—N/a
2011	Alien Exorcism	Varo Venturi	—N/a
2011	Killer Elite	Gary McKendry	—N/a
2012	Cloud Atlas	Lana Wachowski; Tom Tykwer; Lilly Wachowski	—N/a
2012	Open Heart	Kief Davidson	Short film
2013	Wolf Creek 2	Greg McLean	—N/a
2014	I, Frankenstein	Stuart Beattie	—N/a
2014	Kill Me Three Times	Kriv Stenders	—N/a
2016	A Hologram for the King	Tom Tykwer	—N/a
2016	Lord of Shanghai	Sherwood Hu	—N/a
2016	The Darkness	Greg McLean	—N/a
2017	This Crazy Heart	Marc Rothemund	—N/a
2017	Jungle	Greg McLean	—N/a
2017	This Is Congo	Daniel McCabe	—N/a
2018	Breaking In	James McTeigue	—N/a
2021	The Matrix Resurrections	Lana Wachowski	Themes by Don Davis, Composed with Tom Tykwer
2023	Weekend Rebels	Marc Rothemund	Composed with Hans Hafner
2025	The Light	Tom Tykwer	Opening film of Berlinale 2025

=== Television ===
Year	Title	Notes
2002	Without a Trace	6 episodes
2004–2006	Deadwood	31 episodes
2007	John from Cincinnati	10 episodes
2008	The Two Mr. Kissels	Television film
2011	Locke & Key	Television pilot
2012	Awake	12 episodes
2013	The Newsroom	13 episodes
2014	Mind Games	13 episodes
2015–2018	Sense8	24 episodes
2017–2020	Babylon Berlin	28 episodes
2019	Jett	9 episodes
2020	Messiah	10 episodes
2026	The Party	5 episodes
