= Winter Sleepers =

- Theatrical release poster
- Directed by: Tom Tykwer
- Written by: Tom Tykwer
- Screenplay by: Anne-Françoise Pyszora
- Based on: Expense of Spirit by Anne-Françoise Pyszora
- Produced by: Stefan Arndt
- Starring: Ulrich Matthes; Heino Ferch; Floriane Daniel; Marie-Lou Sellem; Josef Bierbichler; Agathe Taffertshofer; Laura Tonke; Sofia Dirscherl; Werner Schnitzer; Sebastian Schipper
- Cinematography: Frank Griebe
- Edited by: Katja Dringenberg
- Music by: Reinhold Heil; Tom Tykwer; Johnny Klimek
- Distributed by: Prokino Filmverleih; Bavaria Film International
- Release date: 30 October 1997
- Running time: 124 minutes
- Country: Germany
- Language: German

Winter Sleepers (German: Winterschläfer meaning "hibernators") is a 1997 German film directed by Tom Tykwer. It premiered at the Locarno International Film Festival.

== Plot ==
The film is set in the snowy alpine resort of Berchtesgaden in Bavaria. The story begins shortly after Christmas Day, with five people returning, not all of whom are connected.

Laura, a surgical nurse, and Rebecca, a translator, live together in a house that Laura inherited. René is a projectionist in a cinema. Marco, Rebecca's boyfriend, is a skiing instructor who drives an Alfa Romeo. Theo is a middle-aged farmer who lives with his wife Edith, their daughter, and two sons on a poor farm nearby.

When Marco arrives, he is greeted passionately by Rebecca. He leaves his car open, with the key still in the ignition. Walking by the house in the early morning, a drunken René takes pictures, including of Rebecca and Marco having sex inside. Finally, he climbs into the car and drives away. Theo, meanwhile, is taking his horse to the veterinarian, but doesn't notice when his daughter sneaks into the horse trailer with the animal. Distracted and swerving into the opposite lane, Theo almost collides with René. The Alfa Romeo crashes into a snowdrift but Rene is not hurt. However, the trailer is flipped over and the girl and horse are badly injured. Rather than helping, René takes a photo and walks off. Theo is dazed, but vaguely notes a striking snake-like scar on the back of René's head. When Theo is helped out of his truck by a passing driver, he shoots the injured horse and takes his daughter to the hospital where Laura works.

Laura overhears Theo becoming obsessed with proving his innocence. No-one believes that there was another driver, because the car is buried under snow. All he remembers is the shape of René's scar. His daughter had surgery and is in a coma.

Marco reports the car theft to the police and becomes exasperated by their lack of progress. Rebecca is dissatisfied with their relationship; she sees him as taking her for granted, jealous without cause, and lacking ambition. Outside of their passionate sex life, they argue constantly. Meanwhile Laura befriends René. He gives her a free pass for the cinema and eventually shows her his photos in an organized album. The reason he takes them is his short-term memory problems which were caused by a head injury while serving in the army; without photos he would have no way of remembering places or people.

Theo and Edith shut down their indebted farm. Theo draws a picture of the shape he remembers and sticks up copies around town, appealing for people to come forward with information. But Edith takes down all his posters, believing he is only trying to escape his own guilt and explaining that she's ashamed.

Marco has started an affair with Nina, a young student in his skiing class. He invites her to his boss's house while his boss is out of town, pretending it is his. Later, he has to go to the hospital after burning himself on the coffee machine and is treated by Laura. While he is there, Theo's daughter dies.

Reinvestigating the crash site, Theo locates the buried car and identifies Marco as the owner. He goes to Marco's workplace and is told Marco is skiing in the mountains, with Nina. They become separated in fog, and Nina injures herself by falling off a ledge and onto a tree. After falling out of the tree, Nina staggers to Theo's new residence and is tended to by Edith. Desperately trying to find Nina, Marco meets Theo on the mountainside where Theo sets his dog onto Marco. When Marco demands to know what's happening, Theo explains only "You killed her." Not knowing about Theo's daughter, Marco starts to panic about losing Nina. After injuring Theo's aggressive German shepherd, Marco manages to ski away before going over the edge of a cliff, and he falls, seemingly forever, into a crevasse in the valley, to his death.

In another coincidence, Rebecca and the injured Nina depart on the same train, but don't know each other. The film ends with the birth of René and Laura's child.

== Production ==
The film is based on the novel Expense of Spirit by Anne-Françoise Pyszora; however, this original story does not contain the character of Theo, and takes place in summer: Tykwer felt the film would be more attractive in a snowy winter setting. The story of the two couples is faithful to the novel.

The soundtrack album was released on 3 November 1997 on Ariola Records/BMG. The tracks include the song "Untitled #1" by Spain and the orchestral piece Fratres by Arvo Pärt, which crop up on multiple occasions in the film. The CD is no longer in print.
