= Run Lola Run =

1998 German film by Tom Tykwer

- Theatrical release poster
- German: Lola Rennt
- Directed by: Tom Tykwer
- Written by: Tom Tykwer
- Produced by: Stefan Arndt
- Starring: Franka Potente; Moritz Bleibtreu; Herbert Knaup; Nina Petri; Joachim Król; Armin Rohde; Heino Ferch; Suzanne von Borsody; Sebastian Schipper
- Narrated by: Hans Paetsch
- Cinematography: Frank Griebe
- Edited by: Mathilde Bonnefoy
- Music by: Tom Tykwer; Johnny Klimek; Reinhold Heil
- Production companies: X-Filme Creative Pool; WDR; Arte
- Distributed by: Prokino Filmverleih
- Release date: 20 August 1998
- Running time: 80 minutes
- Country: Germany
- Language: German
- Budget: $1.75 million
- Box office: $23.7 million

Run Lola Run (German: Lola rennt, lit. 'Lola Runs') is a 1998 German avant-garde thriller film written and directed by Tom Tykwer. It follows a woman named Lola (Franka Potente) who needs to obtain 100,000 marks (equivalent to €71,000 in 2021) in 20 minutes to save the life of her boyfriend, Manni (Moritz Bleibtreu).

Run Lola Run screened at the 55th Venice International Film Festival, where it competed for the Golden Lion. Following its release, the film received critical acclaim and several accolades, including the Audience Award at the Sundance Film Festival, Best Film at the Seattle International Film Festival, and seven awards at the German Film Awards. It was also nominated for the BAFTA Award for Best Film Not in the English Language and selected as the German entry for the Best International Feature Film at the 71st Academy Awards.

== Plot ==
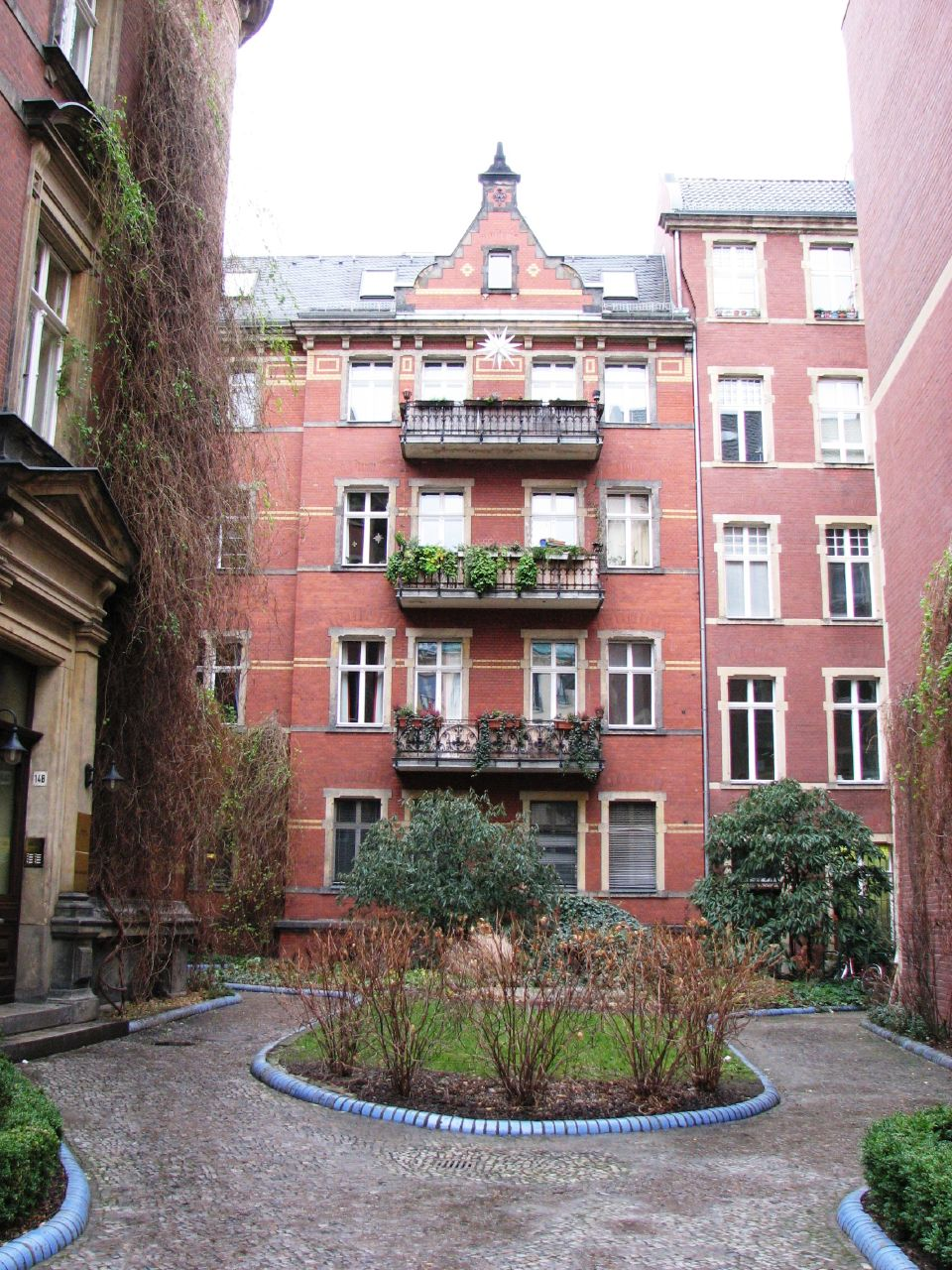
The house in Albrechtstraße (Berlin-Mitte) where the three episodes begin

Manni, a bagman responsible for delivering 100,000 marks, frantically calls his girlfriend Lola. Manni says that he was riding the U-Bahn to drop off the money and fled upon seeing ticket inspectors, before realizing that he left the money bag behind; he saw a homeless man examining it as the train pulled away. Manni's boss Ronnie will kill him in 20 minutes unless he has the money, so he is preparing to rob a nearby supermarket to replace the funds. Lola implores Manni to wait for her and decides to ask her father, a bank manager, for help.

Lola runs down the staircase of her apartment building past a man with a dog. At the bank, her father is conversing with his mistress, who discloses her pregnancy. When Lola arrives, her conversation with her father turns into an argument. He tells her that he is leaving her mother and that Lola is not his biological daughter. Lola runs to meet Manni but arrives too late and sees him entering the supermarket with a gun. She helps him steal 100,000 marks but they find the place surrounded by police. Surrendering, Manni throws the money bag into the air, which startles a police officer who accidentally shoots Lola dead.

Events restart from the moment Lola leaves the house. This time, the man with the dog trips her, and she runs with a limp and arrives late to the bank, allowing her father's mistress to add that he is not the father of her unborn child. A furious Lola overhears, grabs a security guard's gun, holds her father hostage and robs the bank of 100,000 marks. When police mistake her for a bystander, she is able to leave and meet with Manni in time and stop him from robbing a supermarket, but a speeding ambulance that Lola distracted moments earlier runs him over.

Events begin again. Lola leaps over the man and his dog, arriving at the bank earlier but not triggering an auto accident as she did the first two times. Consequently, her father's customer arrives before her and leaves with her father. Lola wanders aimlessly before entering a casino, where she hands over all her cash and plays roulette with a 100-mark chip. She bets it on the number 20, which wins. Roulette pays 35 to 1, so she wins 3,500 more marks, which she immediately adds to her original chip on 20. The 20 comes up again. She leaves with a bag containing 129,600 marks and runs to Manni's rendezvous. Manni spots the homeless man from the underground train passing by on a bicycle with the money bag. Manni steals back the bag at gunpoint, exchanging his gun. A dishevelled and perspiring Lola arrives to witness Manni handing over the money to Ronnie. As the pair walk along, Manni casually asks Lola about her bag.

== Cast ==
- Franka Potente as Lola
- Moritz Bleibtreu as Manni
- Herbert Knaup as Lola's father
- Nina Petri as Frau Hansen
- Armin Rohde as Herr Schuster
- Joachim Król as Norbert von Au
- Ludger Pistor as Herr Meyer
- Suzanne von Borsody as Frau Jäger
- Sebastian Schipper as Mike
- Julia Lindig as Doris
- Lars Rudolph as Herr Kruse
- Ute Lubosch as Mama
- Monica Bleibtreu as the blind woman
- Heino Ferch as Ronnie
- Hans Paetsch as Narrator

== Themes ==
The film touches on themes such as free will vs. determinism, the role of chance in people's destiny, and obscure cause-effect relationships. Through brief flash-forward sequences of still images, Lola's fleeting interactions with bystanders are revealed to have surprising and drastic effects on their future lives, serving as concise illustrations of chaos theory's butterfly effect, in which minor, seemingly inconsequential variations in any interaction can blossom into much broader results than is often recognized. The film's exploration of the relationship between chance and conscious intention comes to the foreground in the casino scene, where Lola appears to defy the laws of chance through sheer force of will, improbably making the roulette ball land on her winning number with the help of a glass-shattering scream.

The thematic exploration of free will vs. determinism is made clear from the start. In the film's brief prologue, an unseen narrator asks a series of rhetorical questions that prime the audience to view the film through a metaphysical lens touching on traditional philosophical questions involving determinism vs. philosophic libertarianism as well as epistemology. The theme is reinforced through the repeated appearance of a blind woman who briefly interacts with Manni in each alternative reality, and seems to have supernatural understandings of both the present and potential futures in those realities. The film ultimately seems to favor a compatibilist philosophical view to the free will question as evidenced by the casino scene and by the final telephone booth scene in which the blind woman redirects Manni's attention to a passerby, which enables him to make an important choice near the film's climax.

Several moments in the film allude to a supernatural awareness of the characters. For example, in the first reality, Manni shows a nervous Lola how to use a gun by removing the safety, while in the second timeline she removes the safety as though she remembers what to do. This suggests that she might have the memory of the events depicted in the previous timeline. Also, the bank's guard says to Lola "you finally came" in the third timeline, as if he remembered Lola's appearances in the previous two.

The theme of desire is expressed through the film as a driving force for Lola's actions. In Ingebord Majer O'Sickey's essay "Whatever Lola Wants, Lola Gets (Or Does She?): Time and Desire in Tom Tykwer's Run Lola Run" she argues that "what Lola really wants is to get into time sync with Manni in sexual terms". The conflict in the plot is driven by the initial phone conversation following Lola being late, leading to their timing to be out of sync. After the end of the first "episode", the bedside questioning by Lola reveals her dissatisfaction with the relationship, leading Manni to ask "Do you want to leave me?". O'Sickey makes the argument that each repeated return to the day is driven by Lola's continual attempt to adjust Manni's timing. The entirety of the film portrays Lola as "postmodern heroine who could leap over traditional time-constraints" giving the expectation that she ultimately would get what she wants. By the third arrival in the film, O'Sickey argues that "Lola not only loses her super heroine status, but her desire to desire". She claims the ending portrays "the tradition of classical Hollywood cinema's economy of desire". With Manni having reacquired the money, Lola's desire to be "in sync" disappears as she watches Manni's "metamorphosis from a bungling and fairly ineffective lover to a man in control of the situation". O'Sickey makes the claim that this deflates Lola's heroine status in the final act.

== Production ==
=== Soundtrack ===
The soundtrack, by Tykwer, Johnny Klimek, and Reinhold Heil, was released through TVT Records on 15 June 1999, featuring 16 tracks.

=== Filming locations ===
Run Lola Run was filmed in and around Berlin, Germany.

== Reception ==
=== Critical reception ===
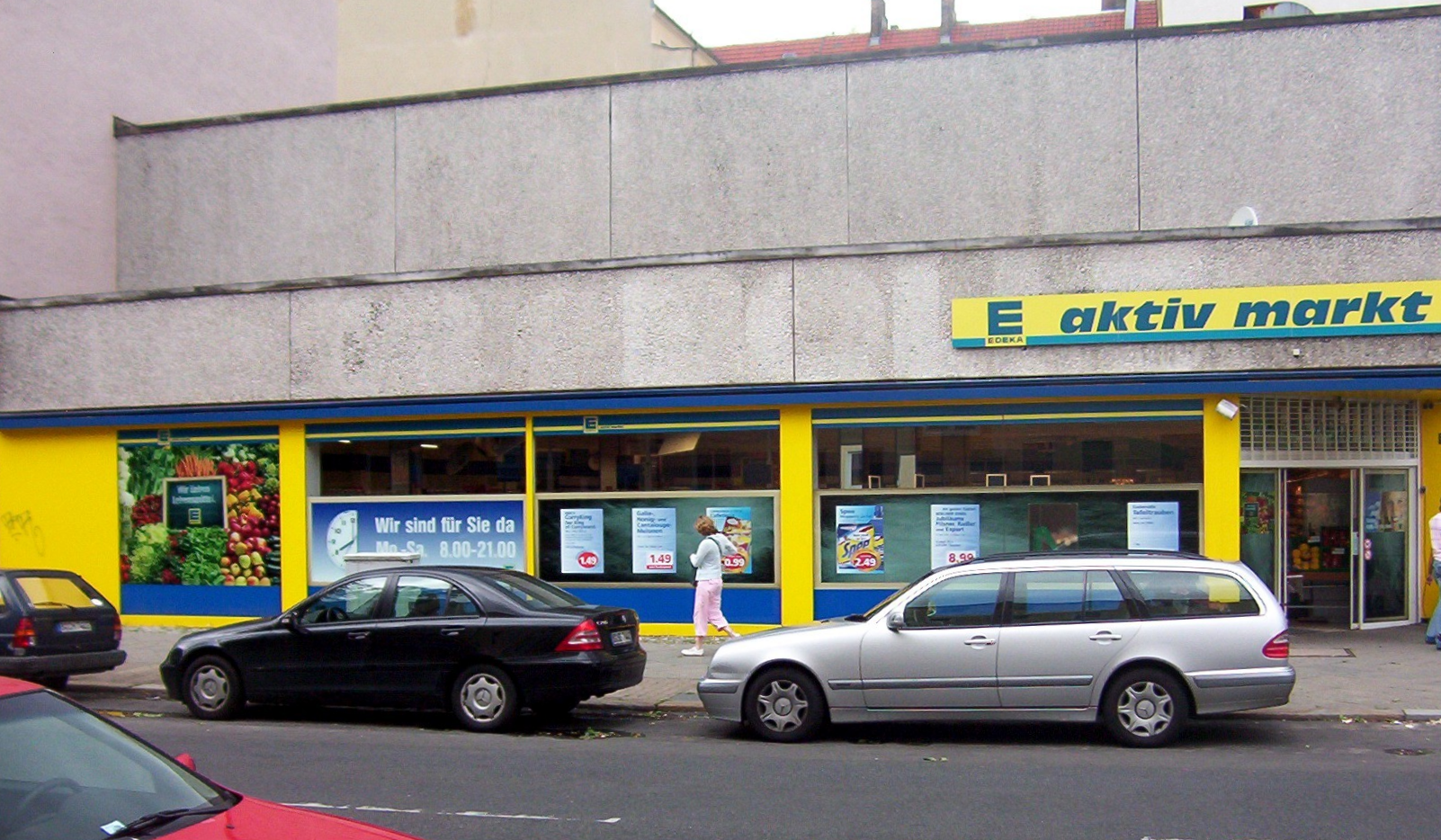
A former Bolle supermarket (now an EDEKA aktiv markt) in Berlin-Charlottenburg, which served as the filming location for Manni's and Lola's robbery.

In contrasting reviews at the time of the film's release, Film Threat's Chris Gore said of the film, "[It] delivers everything great foreign films should—action, sex, compelling characters, clever filmmaking, it's unpretentious (a requirement for me) and it has a story you can follow without having to read those annoying subtitles. I can't rave about this film enough—this is passionate filmmaking at its best. One of the best foreign films, heck, one of the best films I have seen", while Jonathan Rosenbaum of The Chicago Reader stated, "About as entertaining as a no-brainer can be—a lot more fun, for my money, than a cornball theme-park ride like Speed, and every bit as fast moving. But don't expect much of an aftertaste."

As of October 2024, the review aggregator Rotten Tomatoes reports that 94% of critics gave the film positive reviews based on 93 reviews, with an average rating of 7.70/10. The site's critical consensus reads, "More fun than a barrel of Jean-Paul Sartre, pic's energy riffs on an engaging love story and really human performances while offering a series of what-ifs and a blood-stirring soundtrack." On Metacritic, the film has an average score of 77 out of 100, based on 29 reviews, stating the film as having "generally favourable reviews".

=== Box office ===
The film was the highest-grossing German film released in 1998 with a gross of $13.8 million. It grossed $8.1 million in the United States and Canada and $23.7 million worldwide.

=== Accolades ===
The film was nominated for dozens of awards, including the BAFTA Award for Best Film Not in the English Language. It won several, including the Audience Award at the 1999 Sundance Film Festival, Best Film at the Seattle International Film Festival, and seven separate awards at the German Film Awards. Lola Rennt was ranked number 86 in Empire magazine's "The 100 Best Films Of World Cinema" in 2010. It was also nominated for the Golden Lion at the 55th Venice International Film Festival, and a European Film Award in 1998.

Run Lola Run was selected as the German entry for the Best Foreign Language Film at the 71st Academy Awards, but not ultimately nominated.

== Adaptations ==
A Run Lola Run book of the movie, written by the film's director Tom Tykwer, was published in German in 1998 by Rowohlt Verlag. The book was accompanied by illustrations from the film's animated scenes, text from the movie as well as a flip-book and a mini-CD of the soundtrack.

== Home media ==
The film was released on DVD on 21 December 1999 and on Blu-ray on 19 February 2008.

== Influence ==
=== Allusions to earlier films ===
The film has drawn numerous comparisons to Polish director Krzysztof Kieślowski's Blind Chance (1981), which also features three scenarios, the outcome of which depends on split-second timing. After Kieślowski's death, Tykwer went on to direct his planned next film, Heaven.

Run Lola Run features two allusions to Alfred Hitchcock's film Vertigo. Like that film, it features recurring images of spirals, such as the Spirale bar behind Manni's phone box, the spiral staircase Lola runs down, and the spirals on the bedsheet. In addition, the painting on the back wall of the casino of a woman's head seen from behind is based on a shot in Vertigo: Tykwer disliked the empty space on the wall behind the roulette table and commissioned production designer Alexander Manasse to paint a picture of Kim Novak as she appeared in Vertigo. Manasse could not remember what she looked like in the film; therefore, he decided to paint the famous shot of the back of her head. The painting took 15 minutes to complete. The bed sheets in the red scenes also feature spiral designs which add to the allusion.

The Lola character is often compared to the Lara Croft character of the video game franchise Tomb Raider.

Coincidentally, the film Sliding Doors (also released in 1998) follows two timelines which diverge based on a seemingly minor decision: one in which the protagonist hesitates for a fellow pedestrian, and the delay causes her to miss a subway train; and another where she sidesteps the pedestrian and catches the train.

== Legacy ==
Run Lola Run has had a significant influence either narratively or aesthetically on multiple films, television shows, and other mediums.

Nintendo producer Eiji Aonuma cited the film while working on the story for The Legend of Zelda: Majora's Mask, which drew some inspiration by the time limit concept seen on the film.

=== Music Videos ===
The music video for "It's My Life" by Bon Jovi, released in 2000, was inspired by the film.

The music video for "Ocean Avenue" by Yellowcard is also seen by some to have been inspired by the film.

The music video for "Happy Homemaker" by Canadian singer Melanie Doane is also an homage to the film.

The music video for "Walk Me to the Bridge" (2014) by Manic Street Preachers directly references the movie.

=== Television ===
Stan Rogow, the executive producer of the Disney Channel original teen comedy Lizzie McGuire, stated the visual design of the show was inspired by Run Lola Run, specifically mentioning Lizzie's animated persona.

The movie has been referenced in various animated series, including the 2001 The Simpsons episode "Trilogy of Error", the 2011 Phineas and Ferb episode "Run, Candace, Run", and a 2021 Pinky and the Brain segment of Animaniacs called "Run Pinky Run".

The series SMILF includes a 2017 episode ("Run, Bridgette, Run or Forty-Eight Burnt Cupcakes & Graveyard Rum") which references the film.

The opening scene of Buffy the Vampire Slayer episode "Beneath You" references the film, where a pink-haired girl is seen running through a German street to techno music reminiscent of the movie.

=== Films ===
Two Hindi language remakes of the film was release, Ek Din 24 Ghante in 2003, and Looop Lapeta in 2022.

For its 25th anniversary in 2024, the film was re-released in 4k in select United States theaters.

== See also ==
- List of films featuring time loops
- List of submissions to the 71st Academy Awards for Best Foreign Language Film
- List of German submissions for the Academy Award for Best International Feature Film
- Ek Din 24 Ghante, a 2003 unofficial Indian remake
- "Remedial Chaos Theory"
- Sliding Doors
