= Tom Tykwer =

German film director

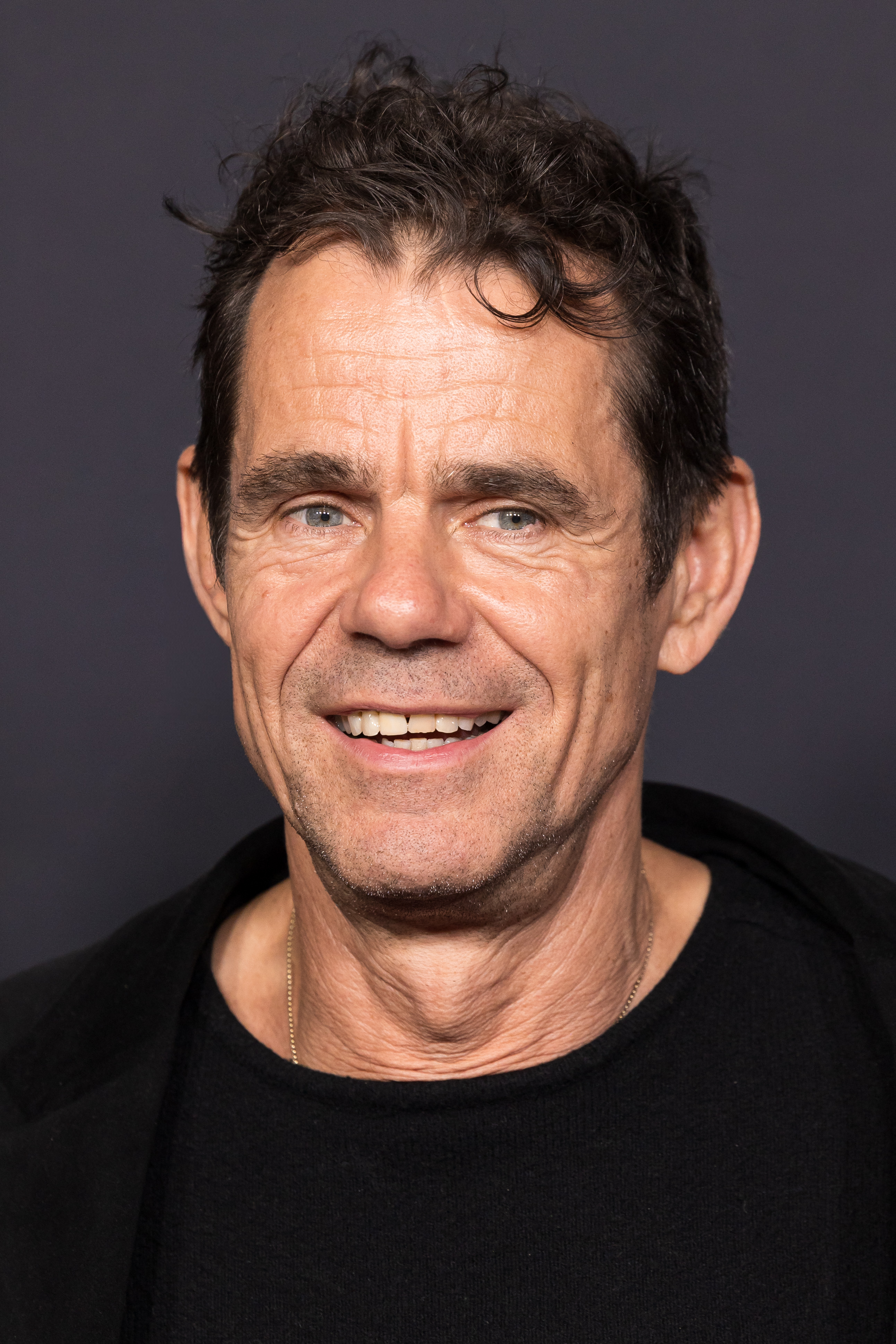
- Tykwer at the 74th Berlin International Film Festival in 2024
- Born: 23 May 1965 (age 61); Wuppertal, West Germany
- Occupations: Film director; screenwriter; producer; film composer
- Years active: 1986–present
- Spouse: Marie Steinmann (m. 2009)
- Children: 1

Tom Tykwer (German: [ˈtɪkvɐ]; born 23 May 1965) is a German film director, producer, screenwriter, and composer. He is best known internationally for directing the thriller films Run Lola Run (1998), Heaven (2002), Perfume: The Story of a Murderer (2006), and The International (2009). He collaborated with The Wachowskis as co-director for the science fiction film Cloud Atlas (2012) and the Netflix series Sense8 (2015–2017), and worked on the score for Lana Wachowski's The Matrix Resurrections (2021). Tykwer is also well known as the co-creator of the internationally acclaimed German television series Babylon Berlin (2017–2026).

== Early life and education ==
Tom Tykwer was born on 23 May 1965 in Wuppertal, West Germany.

Fascinated by film from an early age, he started making amateur Super 8 films at the age of 11. He later helped out at a local arthouse cinema in order to see more films, including those for which he was too young to buy tickets. After graduating from high school, he applied to numerous film schools around Europe, unsuccessfully.

== Career ==
=== 1986–1995 ===
Tykwer moved to Berlin where he worked as a projectionist. In 1987, at the age of 22, he became the programmer of the Moviemento cinema and became known to German directors as a film buff. In Berlin, Tykwer met and befriended the filmmaker Rosa von Praunheim, who urged him to create stories from his own experience. He suggested, for example, that Tykwer record arguments with his girlfriend, and turn them into a short film. Because (1990) was screened at the Hof International Film Festival and well received by the audience, which inspired Tykwer to continue pursuing filmmaking.

He made a second short film, Epilog (1992), for which he took on personal financial debt, but he also gained valuable technical film making experience. Tykwer wrote the screenplay for, and directed, his first feature film, the psychological thriller Deadly Maria (1993). It aired on German television and had a limited theatrical release in Germany and the international film festival circuit.

In 1994, Tykwer founded the production company X Filme Creative Pool with Stefan Arndt, Wolfgang Becker, and Dani Levy.

=== 1996–2005 ===
Tykwer and Becker wrote the screenplay for the comedy Life Is All You Get (1997), while working on Winter Sleepers (1997), Tykwer's second feature and a much bigger and more complex production than Deadly Maria. Winter Sleepers brought Tykwer to the attention of German cineastes and film festivals, but he was struggling financially.

His next feature film, Run Lola Run (1998), became the most successful German film of 1998, earned $7 mln at the US box office, and elevated Tykwer to international fame. As Lola was becoming a success worldwide, Tykwer was already at work on his next film, The Princess and the Warrior (2000), a love story about a nurse and a former soldier, which was shot in his home town of Wuppertal.

Miramax produced his next film, Heaven (2002), based on a screenplay by Polish filmmaker Krzysztof Kieślowski, which was shot in English, starred Cate Blanchett and Giovanni Ribisi, and was filmed in Turin and Tuscany.

=== 2006–2015 ===
Tykwer was approached by French producers to film a short contribution to Paris, je t'aime (2006), a film composed of 20 short films by many famous directors depicting love in Paris. Tykwer shot the 10-minute short film, True, with Natalie Portman and Melchior Beslon. He shot the film quickly with almost no pre-production. The result, Tykwer later said, "symbolises an entire life for me, in just ten minutes."

Tykwer shot the film Pink Children (2012) together with 4 German directors about their mentor Rosa von Praunheim.

Tykwer's next film was Perfume: The Story of a Murderer (2006), an adaptation of the novel Perfume by the German novelist Patrick Süskind. It was filmed in the Spanish cities of Figueras, Girona and Barcelona. Tykwer later made his Hollywood debut with the big-budgeted 2009 conspiracy thriller The International, starring Clive Owen and Naomi Watts, which was shot in several locations ranging from Berlin, Milan, New York City, and Istanbul. The film received a lukewarm reception from the public and critics alike.

=== 2016–present ===
Tykwer directed 2016's A Hologram for the King, starring Tom Hanks and Sarita Choudhury, based on a novel by American novelist Dave Eggers. In 2017, Tykwer co-created the television series Babylon Berlin, directing and writing the screenplay; set in 1920s Berlin, the series comprised 16 episodes in its first two seasons. A third season premiered in 2020. Later on, in 2023, the fifth season has been announced. The entire fifth and final season premiered on 10 September 2026. on the ARD Mediathek.

In 2018, Tykwer headed the 68th Berlinale.

In December 2024, it was announced that Tykwer's upcoming film The Light (Das Licht), starring Lars Eidinger and Nicolette Krebitz, would open the 75th Berlinale on 13 February 2025.

== Musical composition ==
Since Winter Sleepers, the music for all of Tykwer's films (with the exception of Heaven) has been composed by Johnny Klimek, Reinhold Heil, and Tykwer. The trio gave themselves the name "Pale 3", and it originally worked as a film scoring group, then expanding to produce music unrelated to film.

== Awards ==
- 1994: Bavarian Film Awards, Best New Director
- 1998: Bavarian Film Awards, Best Production
- 2005: State-Award of the Film Commission North Rhine-Westphalia
- 2006: Bavarian Film Awards, Best Director
- 2012: Golden Globe Awards, Best Original Score for Cloud Atlas (Nominated)

== Filmography ==
=== Film ===
Year	Title	Role				Notes
Year	Title	Director	Writer	Producer	Composer	Notes
1993	Deadly Maria	Yes	Yes	Yes	Yes	
1997	Life Is All You Get	No	Yes	No	No	
1997	Winter Sleepers	Yes	Yes	No	Yes	
1998	Run Lola Run	Yes	Yes	No	Yes	
1999	Absolute Giganten	No	No	Yes	No	
2000	The Princess and the Warrior	Yes	Yes	No	Yes	
2002	Heaven	Yes	No	No	No	
2003	The Matrix Revolutions	No	No	No	Yes	Composed "In My Head" under the name Pale 3
2004	Soundless	No	No	Yes	No	
2006	A Friend of Mine	No	No	Yes	No	
2006	Perfume: The Story of a Murderer	Yes	Yes	No	Yes	
2006	The Heart Is a Dark Forest	No	No	Yes	No	
2009	The International	Yes	No	No	Yes	
2010	Three	Yes	Yes	No	Yes	
2010	Soul Boy	No	No	Yes	No	
2011	Endlich	No	No	Yes	No	
2012	Cloud Atlas	Yes	Yes	Yes	Yes	Co-directed with The Wachowskis
2012	Pink Children	Yes	Yes	No	Yes	
2011	Nairobi Half Life	No	No	Yes	No	
2013	Culture Hacking	No	No	Yes	No	
2016	A Hologram for the King	Yes	Yes	No	Yes	
2021	The Matrix Resurrections	No	No	No	Yes	Themes by Don Davis, Co-composed with Johnny Klimek
2025	The Light	Yes	Yes	No	No	Opening film of Berlinale 2025
2026	I Rarely Wake Up Dreaming	No	No	Yes	No	

=== Television ===
Year	Title	Role					Notes
Year	Title	Director	Writer	Creator	Executive producer	Composer	Notes
2015–17	Sense8	Yes	No	No	No	Yes	Directed 3 episodes
2017–26	Babylon Berlin	Yes	Yes	Yes	Yes	Yes	

Other roles

- Inglourious Basterds (2009) — German dialogue translator.

== Personal life ==
In 2009, Tykwer signed a petition in support of film director Roman Polanski, calling for his release after Polanski was arrested in Switzerland in relation to his 1977 sexual abuse case.Tykwer lives in Berlin.
