= Sense8 season 1 =

Sense8
- Season 1
- Promotional poster
- Starring: Aml Ameen; Doona Bae; Jamie Clayton; Tina Desai; Tuppence Middleton; Max Riemelt; Miguel Ángel Silvestre; Brian J. Smith; Freema Agyeman; Terrence Mann; Anupam Kher; Naveen Andrews; Daryl Hannah
- No. of episodes: 12

Release
- Original network: Netflix
- Original release: June 5, 2015

Season chronology
- Next → Season 2

The first season of Sense8, an American science fiction drama television series created by Lana and Lilly Wachowski and J. Michael Straczynski, follows eight strangers from different parts of the world who suddenly discover that they are a cluster of "sensates"; human beings, born on the same day (August 8 for this particular cluster) who are mentally and emotionally linked. The season was produced for Netflix by the Wachowskis' Anarchos Productions and Straczynski's Studio JMS, along with Javelin Productions and Georgeville Television. Unpronounceable Productions was set up to oversee production for the show.

A multinational ensemble cast starring Aml Ameen, Doona Bae, Jamie Clayton, Tina Desai, Tuppence Middleton, Max Riemelt, Miguel Ángel Silvestre, and Brian J. Smith portray the suddenly connected strangers, with Freema Agyeman, Terrence Mann, Anupam Kher, Naveen Andrews, and Daryl Hannah also star. The season acts as the origin story for the eight sensates. All episodes were written by the Wachowskis and Straczynski and the majority of them were directed by the Wachowskis, with the remainder being divided between their frequent collaborators James McTeigue, Tom Tykwer, and Dan Glass. Filming took place almost entirely on location in nine cities around the world, the home cities of the eight lead characters: (Note: Middleton's Icelandic character is living in London, but later returns to her Reykjavík home.) Berlin, Chicago, London, Mexico City, Mumbai, Nairobi, Reykjavík, San Francisco, and Seoul.

All 12 episodes of the season became available for streaming on Netflix on June 5, 2015 and were met with generally favorable critical reception. The season was noted for its representation of LGBTQ characters and themes, winning the GLAAD Media Award for Outstanding Drama Series. It was also recognized with a Location Managers Guild award for its use of locations as an integral part of the story, and a Primetime Emmy Award nomination for Outstanding Original Main Title Theme Music.

== Premise ==
Due to a minor chromosomal mutation, "sensates" are members of the genus Homo (the specific species name Homo sensorium is not mentioned until season 2) who are mentally and emotionally linked, can sense and communicate with one another – including simultaneous full body "presence" at each other's locations, and can share their knowledge, languages, and skills. They have existed for as long as Homo sapiens (humans), who lack a similar innate connection to nature and other humans. Late in the season, older sensate Jonas Maliki warns a newly emerged cluster of eight connected sensates about an international human deep state effort to destroy all sensates. He explains that regular humans' lack of connection means that sensates are a threat to the secrets that allow hierarchies to exist, while "that isolation has allowed them to focus on one thing better than any species in history… killing is easy when you can feel nothing."

== Cast ==
=== Main ===
==== The August 8th cluster ====
- Aml Ameen as Capheus "Van Damme" Onyango, a matatu driver in Nairobi who is trying to earn money to buy HIV/AIDS medication for his mother. Capheus' matatu is called the "Van Damn" and sports drawings of Jean-Claude Van Damme as he is a passionate fan of his movies. This, along with his bravery to protect his matatu and its passengers from bandits, earned him his widely used Van Damn nickname (sometimes also called Van Damme). Gabriel Ouma portrays a young Capheus.
- Doona Bae as Sun Bak, daughter of a powerful Seoul businessman and a burgeoning star in the underground kickboxing world. Jane Lee portrays a young Sun.
- Jamie Clayton as Nomi Marks, a trans woman hacktivist and blogger living in San Francisco with her girlfriend Amanita. Nomi chose her name to stand for "Know Me". John Babbo portrays a young Nomi (then called Michael).
- Tina Desai as Kala Dandekar, a university-educated pharmacist and devout Hindu in Mumbai who is engaged to marry a man she does not love. Yashvi Puneet Nagar portrays a young Kala.
- Tuppence Middleton as Riley Blue (née Gunnarsdóttir), an Icelandic DJ living in London who is trying to escape a tragic past. Katrin Sara Olafsdottir portrays a young Riley.
- Max Riemelt as Wolfgang Bogdanow, a Berlin locksmith and safe-cracker who has unresolved issues with his late father and participates in organized crime. Lenius Jung portrays a young Wolfgang.
- Miguel Ángel Silvestre as Lito Rodriguez, a closeted actor of Spanish background living in Mexico City with his boyfriend Hernando.
- Brian J. Smith as Will Gorski, a Chicago police officer haunted by an unsolved murder from his childhood. Speaking about the Wachowskis picking names that carry a significance for their characters, Smith said about "Will": "The whole idea of Will Gorski, the idea of someone who's got this drive to act and to do, not just to be done to. It's very central to Will's character." Maxwell Jenkins portrays a young Will.

==== Other regulars ====
- Freema Agyeman as Amanita "Neets" Caplan, Nomi's girlfriend, who later becomes an ally for the new sensates.
- Terrence Mann as "Whispers", a sensate who turned against his own kind and who is a high-ranking member of an organization determined to neutralize sensates, known as the Biological Preservation Organization (BPO).
- Anupam Kher as Sanyam Dandekar, Kala's loving father, a chef and restaurant owner.
- Naveen Andrews as Jonas Maliki, a sensate from a different cluster who wants to help the newly-born cluster of sensates.
- Daryl Hannah as Angelica "Angel" Turing, a sensate from the same cluster as Jonas, who becomes the "mother" of the new sensates' cluster as she activates their psychic connection.

=== Recurring ===
The recurring actors are listed by the region in which they first appear.

- In Nairobi, Kenya
  - Paul Ogola as Jela
  - Peter King Mwania as Silas Kabaka
  - Lwanda Jawar as Githu
  - Chichi Seii as Shiro
  - Rosa Katanu as Amondi Kabaka
- In Seoul, South Korea
  - Ki-chan Lee as Joong-Ki Bak
  - Kyong Young Lee as Kang-Dae Bak
  - Hye Hwa Kim as Mi-Cha
  - Yuh-Jung Youn as Min-Jung
  - Sara Sohn as Soo-Jin
  - In Pyo Cha as Sun's attorney
- In San Francisco, California, United States of America
  - Adam Shapiro as Dr. Metzger
  - Michael Sommers as Bug
  - Sandra Fish as Janet Marks
  - Maximilienne Ewalt as Grace
- In Mumbai, Maharashtra, India
  - Purab Kohli as Rajan Rasal
  - Natasha Rastogi as Priya Dandekar
  - Darshan Jariwala as Manendra Rasal
  - Mita Vasisht as Sahana Rasal
  - Chandarmohan Khanna as Guru Yash
  - Huzane Mewawala as Daya Dandekar
  - Avantika Akerkar as Aunty Ina
  - Shruti Bapna as Devi
- In London, England, United Kingdom
  - Frank Dillane as Shugs
  - Nicôle Lecky as Bambie
  - Joseph Mawle as Nyx
- In Reykjavík, Iceland
  - Kristján Kristjánsson as Gunnar
  - Lilja Þórisdóttir as Yrsa
  - Eyþór Gunnarsson as Sven
  - Thor Birgisson as Magnus Þórsson
- In Berlin, Germany
  - Max Mauff as Felix Bernner
  - Sylvester Groth as Sergei Bogdanow
  - Christian Oliver as Steiner Bogdanow
  - Bernhard Schütz as Anton Bogdanow
  - Georg Tryphon as Abraham
- In Mexico City, Mexico
  - Alfonso Herrera as Hernando Fuentes
  - Eréndira Ibarra as Daniela Velazquez
  - Raúl Méndez as Joaquin Flores
  - Ari Brickman as the director in Lito's movies
  - Alberto Wolf as bartender
- In Chicago, Illinois, United States of America
  - Ness Bautista as Diego Morales
  - William Burke as Deshawn
  - Larry Clarke as a Police Captain
  - Margot Thorne as Sara Patrell
  - Joe Pantoliano as Michael Gorski

== Episodes ==
No. overall	No. in season	Title	Directed by	Written by	Original release date
1	1	"Limbic Resonance"	The Wachowskis	The Wachowskis & J. Michael Straczynski	June 5, 2015
A woman named Angelica "births" the psychic connection of eight people around the world, before killing herself to avoid capture by a man who has been hunting her. The eight experience the beginnings of their psychic connection, by hearing and seeing what the others do. Riley meets a powerful dealer named Nyx, becoming entangled in London's drug world. Sun faces sexism in her father's company. Capheus' matatu business is failing. Lito turns down the sexual advances of a female co-star of his, telling her he loves someone else. Nomi spends time with her girlfriend Amanita, recalling she fell in love with her when Amanita defended her against transgender discrimination. Kala prays to Ganesha for guidance on marrying Rajan, a man she does not love. Will brings a young gangster who has been shot to the hospital. Wolfgang and his best friend Felix steal diamonds that Wolfgang's gangster cousin, Steiner, had been planning to steal. In Chicago, Will decides to investigate the church in which Angelica killed herself; Riley appears there too, through her and Will's connection. Back in London, Riley's boyfriend attempts to rob Nyx, and the ensuing fight ends with Riley the only survivor in the room.
2	2	"I Am Also a We"	The Wachowskis	The Wachowskis & J. Michael Straczynski	June 5, 2015
While at the San Francisco Pride with Amanita, Nomi spots Jonas, Angelica's lover, and faints. She awakens in the hospital with her sister and transphobic mother. Dr. Metzger claims that Nomi needs a brain operation and keeps her in the hospital against her will. Jonas visits Nomi telepathically and warns her that the operation will lobotomize her. Will and his partner Diego discover a gap in the CCTV footage while investigating Angelica's suicide. The Department of Homeland Security briefs Will's precinct that Jonas is wanted for murder; Will believes this is linked to a girl from his past named Sara Patrell. A fellow movie star, Daniela, learns the truth about Lito: he is gay and lives with his boyfriend Hernando. She is happy about the situation and excited to help them as Lito's beard. Kala's parents meet their future in-laws. Wolfgang and Kala begin to see visions of each other. Riley goes on the run when she discovers her purse holds Nyx's money and drugs. Jonas comes to Will in person, telling him that Will is a "sensate" and that Nomi needs his help, just like Sara once did. Will tells Jonas he has to turn him in and crashes into his car.
3	3	"Smart Money Is on the Skinny Bitch"	The Wachowskis	The Wachowskis & J. Michael Straczynski	June 5, 2015
Will wakes up from the crash and learns Homeland has captured Jonas. Riley throws the drugs away and gives the money to a piano-playing busker. She takes refuge with Shugs, an old acquaintance of hers, and his girlfriend Bambie. Sun becomes increasingly frustrated by financial problems at her corporation and her inability to reach her father, the CEO. She moonlights as an underground kickboxer, unbeknownst to everyone but her trainer. Will opens Sara's case file and recalls that when she disappeared at the age of 10, he had visions of her. In them, Sara was being lobotomized by a mysterious man and was asking Will to help her. Amanita lights a fire in Nomi's hospital, delaying her operation. Daniela reveals to Lito that she is hiding from her gangster ex-boyfriend, Joaquin, having cheated on him. Joaquin shows up at Lito's work and intimidates him. Capheus and his partner, Jela, buy AIDS medicine for Capheus' mother, but their matatu is attacked and robbed by bandits. Capheus channels Sun's fighting skills and Will's marksmanship to defeat the bandits.
4	4	"What's Going On?"	Tom Tykwer	The Wachowskis & J. Michael Straczynski	June 5, 2015
Silas Kabaka, a high-ranking gangster, offers Capheus quality AIDS medicine in exchange for protecting a bag. Kala encounters religious conservatives at the temple, who are praying for the death of Rajan's father, a prominent atheist politician. Sun confronts her father and brother, Joong-Ki, about Joong-Ki embezzling money. She volunteers to take the blame in order to save the company, as her mother's dying wish was to take care of Joong-Ki. Wolfgang and Felix manage to sell some of the diamonds. Will encounters Jonas in a vision; Jonas explains that the phenomenon is called "visiting", which is something all sensates can do once they have made eye contact, although members of a cluster can do it instinctively. He further explains that sensates can "share" each other's knowledge, language and skills, but only within their cluster. Jonas says Will's cluster has eight members and that he needs to save Nomi. Nomi shares Will's skills, and with the help of Amanita, escapes the hospital. Riley listens to "What's Up?", as Wolfgang sings it karaoke. All eight independently sing along to the song, though Kala and Wolfgang share their first visit starting mid-song – sharing an intimate moment.
5	5	"Art Is Like Religion"	James McTeigue	The Wachowskis & J. Michael Straczynski	June 5, 2015
The first visit between Lito and Sun takes place. Wolfgang is questioned about the diamond heist by his uncle, who makes veiled threats. The first visit between Capheus and Riley takes place, interrupted when Capheus is attacked by bandits, grabbing the package he is delivering for Kabaka. Capheus manages to recover the bag and deliver it to Kabaka, who repays him with more medicine, and reveals that it was only a test. Kala is preparing for the wedding and briefly visits with Wolfgang. Nomi tells Amanita about the visions she has been experiencing. Will discovers that a boy named Clete witnessed what happened inside the church. A local gang protects Clete before Will and Diego can question him. Lito shoots many scenes for his movie, including an action scene while sharing with Will. The first visit between Capheus and Sun occurs, and they converse about their troubles. Sun gives her dog to her trainer as she turns herself in. Nomi and Amanita find their apartment raided. While naked at a spa, Wolfgang visits Kala during her wedding and asks why she is marrying a man she does not love. Kala faints.
6	6	"Demons"	The Wachowskis	The Wachowskis & J. Michael Straczynski	June 5, 2015
Will and Riley visit each other and use their phones to prove to themselves their connection is real. Sun confesses to embezzlement to the press and police detain her; she is denied bail. Nyx, having survived, tracks down Riley and nearly kills her while questioning her about his drugs and money. Riley channels Will's self-defense skills and escapes. Nomi and Amanita move in with Amanita's mother and tell her about Nomi's experiences. Kala wakes up and visits with Wolfgang, trying to resist her growing attraction to him. Rajan tells her that he still wants to marry her. Kabaka gives Capheus the job of driver and bodyguard to his daughter Amondi, who suffers from leukemia. Will, Lito, Nomi, and Wolfgang share a sexual encounter while visiting. Daniela secretly photographs Lito and Hernando having sex. The first visit between Riley and Sun occurs, with Riley sharing that a voice came to her as a child, which told her she was hexed and that bad things would happen if she stayed in Iceland. When her mother died, Riley believed it was her fault. Sun encourages her to return to Iceland.
7	7	"W. W. N. Double D?"	James McTeigue	The Wachowskis & J. Michael Straczynski	June 5, 2015
Nomi acquires hacking tools from Bug, a fellow hacker, to investigate Metzger. Sun is transferred to prison and makes friends and enemies. Riley travels to Iceland to visit her father, Gunnar. Joaquin breaks into Lito's apartment and intimidates Lito and Daniela. He steals Daniela's phone and blackmails her and Lito with the photos she took. Will uncovers the face of the man who hunted Angelica. Nomi visits Nyles Bolger, the only surviving patient of Metzger's, in a nursing home; she finds he has been lobotomized and is virtually catatonic. Kala visits Ganesha's temple to look for answers, but finds herself visiting with Wolfgang again. Nomi clones Metzger's phone and calls the most recent contact, a Dr. Matheson, who seems to know her. Kabaka shows Capheus he will not show mercy to traitors. Steiner shoots and badly wounds Felix. Nomi and Amanita break into Metzger's apartment. Metzger finds them, and panics when he learns that Nomi has spoken to Matheson. Jonas warns Nomi that someone named "Whispers" is coming. Nyles arrives, murders Metzger, and then kills himself. In a mirror, instead of Nyles, Nomi sees the reflection of the man that hunted Angelica; Whispers.
8	8	"We Will All Be Judged by the Courage of Our Hearts"	Dan Glass	The Wachowskis & J. Michael Straczynski	June 5, 2015
Kala visits Wolfgang while he is in the hospital at Felix's bedside. Wolfgang recounts how the two met as kids in detention, and of life with his abusive alcoholic father. Daniela promises to marry Joaquin, despite his abuse, to protect Lito. Hernando breaks up with Lito for letting her do so. Sun defeats a gang of prison-yard bullies and is placed in solitary confinement. The bandits tell Capheus they will kill his mother unless he brings Amondi to them. Riley visits with Will, and she tells him of growing up in Iceland, of her famous pianist father, and her deceased mother, before sharing a kiss. Will finds surveillance footage of Bolger leaving the nursing home with a gun. Will visits Nomi to the bemusement of Amanita. They discover the company behind Metzger and the Angelica and Nyles incidents is the "Biologic Preservation Organization" (BPO). Whispers arrives with police to take Nomi into custody. She escapes with the help of joint visits from Will, Sun, and Capheus. Will is suspended from his job for ignoring orders. Rajan's father meets with Kala at the temple to tell her to cancel the wedding; they are ambushed by religious fundamentalists who stab him repeatedly.
9	9	"Death Doesn't Let You Say Goodbye"	The Wachowskis	The Wachowskis & J. Michael Straczynski	June 5, 2015
Riley discovers the voice from her childhood belongs to Yrsa, who is sensate like her. Yrsa explains that Riley was not safe in Iceland because BPO have a facility there. She also says she will go into hiding, as BPO have the technology to trace connected sensates and they will find her if Riley is captured. Will is visited by Jonas, who is being held prisoner by BPO. Will visits Riley, while she continues to visit Yrsa. Jonas and Yrsa reveal that all members of a cluster are born at the same time, taking their first breath as one. Yrsa becomes agitated when she finds out that Jonas is present. She tells Riley that Jonas and Angelica were collaborators, with Angelica birthing clusters in order to help Whispers hunt sensates. Wolfgang's uncle visits the hospital to warn him not to seek revenge on Steiner. Sun's father comes to visit her and says he has decided to confess the truth. When Lito struggles with the loss of Hernando, Nomi visits him: they share intimate stories of their past. Riley visits the graves of her husband and infant daughter; Capheus visits and tells of his infant sister who was given up for adoption.
10	10	"What Is Human?"	The Wachowskis	The Wachowskis & J. Michael Straczynski	June 5, 2015
Wolfgang visits the Memorial to the Murdered Jews of Europe to think. Sun reluctantly signs the papers that will free her, knowing the consequences for her brother. Steiner threatens to have Felix killed if Wolfgang does not hand over the diamonds. Jonas and Will visit, and Jonas explains sensates have existed since the beginning of humankind. He also tells Will that Whispers will use Jonas to get to Will's cluster. Wolfgang meets Steiner to hand over the diamonds. As Steiner beats Wolfgang and prepares to kill him, Lito visits and concocts a story that distracts Steiner long enough for Wolfgang to kill Steiner and his men. Will and Riley visit, and she reveals to him Yrsa's warning about Jonas. Lito arrives at Joaquin's house to take back Daniela. Lito and Joaquin fight, but he eventually wins with the help of Daniela and Wolfgang. Lito and Daniela joyfully reunite with Hernando. Riley goes to see her father play Beethoven's "Emperor Concerto". The music causes her to remember her birth. The cluster join her and remember their births as well. Riley passes out, bleeding from the nose.
11	11	"Just Turn the Wheel and the Future Changes"	Tom Tykwer	The Wachowskis & J. Michael Straczynski	June 5, 2015
Riley wakes up in a hospital. Yrsa visits and tells Riley that BPO will find and kill her. Will and Nomi realize that BPO will turn Riley into a puppet, like Bolger. Bug provides Nomi with the confiscated hacking equipment. Capheus chooses not to sacrifice Amondi and arrives at the bandits' location empty-handed. The bandits reveal that they have kidnapped Kabaka, and order Capheus to kill him. With the help of Sun and Will, Capheus defeats them and reunites Kabaka with his daughter. Kala informs Rajan about his father's wish to call off the wedding, but Rajan will not change his mind. Joong-Ki visits Sun in prison to tell her their father committed suicide, but Sun deduces he murdered him. Wolfgang smuggles Felix out of the hospital. Kala finds out that Guru Yash and his followers are the ones who tried to kill Rajan's father. Riley has flashbacks to the car accident that killed her husband and baby. Jonas visits Will and Nomi, telling them that Whispers knows about Riley. Whispers uses Jonas to lure Will to Iceland. Kala is afraid of Wolfgang's plan to kill his uncle; the two finally kiss.
12	12	"I Can't Leave Her"	The Wachowskis	The Wachowskis & J. Michael Straczynski	June 5, 2015
Wolfgang reveals to his uncle that as a boy he killed his father, and now Steiner, before finally killing him. Will and Kala help him escape. Kala is horrified by the violence and Wolfgang realizes that they have no future together. Riley is transported to the BPO facility. She relives the car accident that killed her husband and newborn daughter. Will races to the facility in Iceland. Yrsa visits Riley, telling her to kill herself to save her cluster. Riley grabs a guard's gun, but Will convinces her to stop. The whole cluster bands together to help Will rescue Riley. As they escape, Whispers makes eye contact with Will and gets inside his head, while continuing to pursue them. Riley panics when they drive by the car accident location. Jonas tells Will he needs to kill himself in order to save his cluster. Instead, Will takes enough sedatives to knock himself out, and talks to Riley about their feelings for each other, convincing her to find the strength as the cluster's only chance. Riley escapes with an unconscious Will on a boat, as all eight sensates see each other together for the first time.

== Production ==
=== Filming and locations ===
To properly tell the international aspects of the story, filming for Sense8 took place almost entirely on location around the globe. In the first season they filmed in nine cities located in eight countries: Berlin, Chicago, London, Mexico City, Mumbai, Nairobi, Reykjavík, San Francisco, and Seoul. Production on the first season began on June 18, 2014 in San Francisco. The filmmakers successfully negotiated with the organizers of the Clarion Alley Mural Project and select artists to feature their artwork in the show. Shooting in Chicago began on July 9 and wrapped up on August 8, with filming taking place both on location and at the Cinespace Film Studios. They shot some scenes in the Superdawg drive-through restaurant, while customers were being asked not to stare at the filming. Lana and Lilly Wachowski are frequent customers of the place. During location scouting, the producers found the City Methodist Church in Gary, Indiana which is nearby Chicago, and changed one site's description in the scripts to a church accordingly in order to fit that particular site into the filming. They filmed in the church from July 25 to 28. Filming proceeded to London for a short shoot and then to Iceland, where between August 26 and September 6 they shot in Reykjavik and nearby places such as Akranes. Filming then started in Nairobi, where a sequence required a crowd of 700 extras, 200 cars and a helicopter. In Seoul they filmed from September 18 to 30. Next they moved to Mexico City and later to Germany, where they filmed in Berlin and inside Babelsberg Studio. Last place they visited was Mumbai where they also shot a Bollywood dance number that was choreographed by Slumdog Millionaire's Longinus Fernandes. The writers wanted to feature an event in each city. They were able to schedule the Pride scenes with its Dykes on Bikes on the Dyke March in San Francisco, the Fourth of July fireworks celebration in Chicago, and the Ganesha Chaturthi Hindu festival in Mumbai. Additionally they recorded footage from the Fresh Meat Festival of transgender and queer performance in San Francisco, a club event taking place at the KOKO in London, and a real lucha libre (Mexican professional wrestling) event with the fighters wearing wrestling masks in Arena Naucalpan, in Mexico City. Lastly the scenes where characters are flying on an airplane were recorded during the real flights the cast and crew had to do to get from London to Iceland. On November 17, 2014 Straczynski wrote that the main unit shooting had wrapped, with only a few winter shots in Iceland remaining to be captured the next month. These scenes were further delayed to mid-January 2015, until Iceland had the necessary amount of snow, with the wrap party taking place in Reykjavík's Harpa Music and Concert hall on January 21. By the end of the shooting, the filmmakers had completed 100,000 miles of flight time, or four times around the globe.

=== Music ===
Johnny Klimek and Tom Tykwer, who co-composed the score for Cloud Atlas and had a minor contribution in the soundtrack of The Matrix Revolutions as part of Pale 3, composed the season's music which was orchestrated by their fellow Cloud Atlas collaborator Gene Pritsker. The music was written before filming began and it was recorded by the MDR Leipzig Radio Symphony Orchestra. Ethan Stoller and Gabriel Isaac Mounsey, past collaborators of the Wachowskis and Tykwer, are credited for composing additional music and score. Stoller also acted as the season's music editor.

The theme music was picked by the Wachowskis from the two hours of original music Tykwer and Klimek had written. It was shortened from its original seven or eight minutes and a choir and electronic elements were added to it at the wish of the Wachowskis. The show received a nomination for Outstanding Original Main Title Theme Music during the 68th Primetime Creative Arts Emmy Awards.

The title of Episode 4, "What's Going On?", refers to lyrics in the song "What's Up?" by the 4 Non Blondes, which is featured in a scene where the main cast collectively sings it as their first shared experience together. After Nomi escaped from the hospital she said the lyrics were in her head all day and Amanita recognized the song saying it was the perfect soundtrack for a lobotomy.

A soundtrack album for the first season was released digitally by WaterTower Music on May 5, 2017. It includes 10 tracks by Klimek and Tykwer, and four licensed songs including "What's Up?". Klimek and Tykwer's compositions alone, are also available on WaterTower's YouTube channel.

No.	Title	Music	Length
1.	"Sense8 Title Theme"	Johnny Klimek, Tom Tykwer	2:08
2.	"Interconnected"	Johnny Klimek, Tom Tykwer	7:25
3.	"Post Rock Mystery"	Johnny Klimek, Tom Tykwer	6:06
4.	"What's Up?"	4 Non Blondes	4:50
5.	"Bicycle Chase"	Johnny Klimek, Tom Tykwer	7:28
6.	"Tick Tock"	Johnny Klimek, Tom Tykwer	3:57
7.	"Kettering"	The Antlers	5:11
8.	"Mystery"	Johnny Klimek, Tom Tykwer	5:56
9.	"Nomi"	Johnny Klimek, Tom Tykwer	4:09
10.	"Keep It Close"	Seven Lions feat. Kerli	5:13
11.	"The Darkened"	Johnny Klimek, Tom Tykwer	9:05
12.	"What Ever You Know"	Johnny Klimek, Tom Tykwer	6:05
13.	"Dauðalogn"	Sigur Rós	6:36
14.	"Dreamscape"	Johnny Klimek, Tom Tykwer	5:21
Total length:			1:19:30

== Reception ==
=== Critical reception and popularity ===
Critical reception of the first season of Sense8 has been generally favorable. Rotten Tomatoes, a review aggregator website, reported a 71% critical approval rating with an average rating of 6.25/10 based on 62 reviews. The website's critical consensus reads, "Some of the scenarios border on illogical, but the diverse characters and the creative intersections between their stories keep the Wachowskis' Sense8 compelling." On Metacritic, which uses a weighted average, the season is assigned a score of 64 out of 100, based on 24 critics, indicating "generally favorable" reviews.

In a report released by Netflix it was discovered that at least 70% of the viewers that watched up to the third episode ended up watching the entire first season, and Straczynski was told there are people that watch it "straight through – three, four, six times." In another report released by Netflix, Sense8 was listed among the shows whose viewers tend to heavily binge-watch their first seasons, rather than savoring their episodes by watching them at a slower pace. Netflix's Chief Content Officer Ted Sarandos praised the success of Sense8 in the up-and-coming French and German markets but also globally. Vice president of international series for Netflix Erik Barmack has named Sense8 one of the most popular Netflix series in the Brazilian market. Less than three days after the premiere of the first season, Variety reported that it had been pirated more than half a million times, regardless of the series' digital distribution.

=== Accolades ===
Year	Award	Category	Recipient(s)	Result	Ref(s)
2015	Camerimage	First Look – TV Pilots Competition	Lana Wachowski and Lilly Wachowski (directors), Christian Almesberger, Frank Griebe, Danny Ruhlmann and John Toll (cinematographers) (for: "Limbic Resonance")	Nominated	
2016	Dorian Awards	LGBTQ TV Show of the Year	Sense8	Nominated	
2016	Dorian Awards	Campy TV Show of the Year	Sense8	Nominated	
2016	GLAAD Media Awards	Outstanding Drama Series	Sense8	Won	
2016	HPA Awards	Outstanding Color Grading – Television	Tony Dustin (for: "What's Going On?")	Nominated	
2016	Location Managers Guild Awards	Outstanding Locations in a Contemporary Television Series	Marco Giacalone and Bill Bowling	Won	
2016	Saturn Awards	Best New Media Television Series	Sense8	Nominated	
2016	Emmy Awards	Outstanding Original Main Title Theme Music	Johnny Klimek and Tom Tykwer	Nominated	

== Marketing ==
The red carpet premiere of Sense8's first season took place on May 27, 2015, in San Francisco's AMC Metreon, where the first three episodes were previewed. Starting in the middle of July 2015, Netflix Brazil released a series of documentary shorts called Sense8: Decoded. Inspired by Sense8 and directed by João Wainer, the shorts briefly touch upon subjects such as psychiatry, feminism, being transgender and buddhism. Later in the month, Netflix released a music track titled Brainwave Symphony on Spotify. To produce it they subjected eight strangers to a series of various stimuli and they recorded their individual brainwaves using EEG sensors. After extracting a melody from each of them they arranged them in a way to produce a track which mirrors the escalating action of the season. In early August 2015, Netflix made available Sense8: Creating the World, a half-hour web television documentary, shot around the world, about the making of the first season of the series.
