= Sense8 =

American science fiction television series

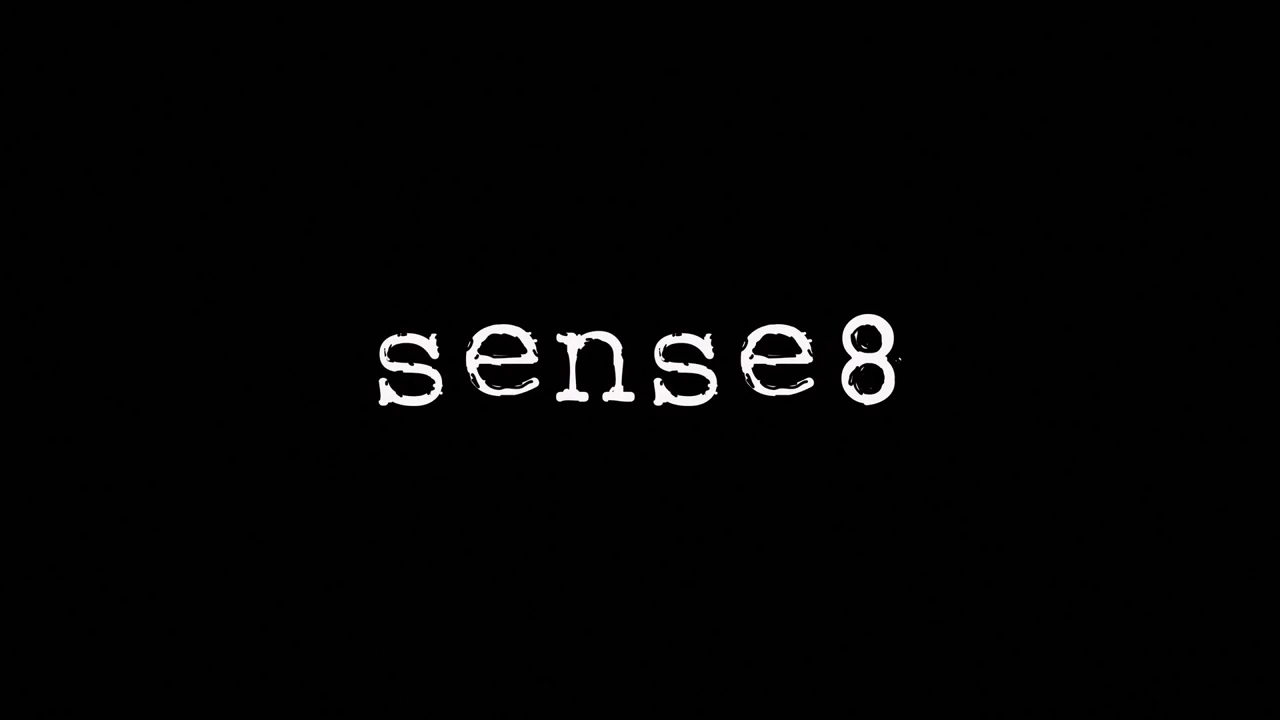
- Genre: Science fiction; Drama
- Created by: The Wachowskis; J. Michael Straczynski
- Written by: Lana Wachowski; Lilly Wachowski; J. Michael Straczynski; David Mitchell; Aleksandar Hemon
- Directed by: Lana Wachowski; Lilly Wachowski; Tom Tykwer; James McTeigue; Dan Glass
- Starring: Aml Ameen; Doona Bae; Jamie Clayton; Tina Desai; Tuppence Middleton; Max Riemelt; Miguel Ángel Silvestre; Brian J. Smith; Freema Agyeman; Terrence Mann; Anupam Kher; Naveen Andrews; Daryl Hannah; Toby Onwumere
- Composers: Johnny Klimek; Tom Tykwer; Gabriel Isaac Mounsey
- Country of origin: United States
- Original language: English
- No. of seasons: 2
- No. of episodes: 24

Production
- Executive producers: Grant Hill; Lana Wachowski; Lilly Wachowski; J. Michael Straczynski; Cindy Holland; Peter Friedlander; Tara Duncan; Deepak Nayar; Leon Clarance; Marc Rosen; John Toll; Laura Delahaye
- Producers: Marcus Loges; L. Dean Jones Jr.; Alex Boden; Terry Needham; Roberto Malerba
- Cinematography: John Toll; Danny Ruhlmann; Frank Griebe; Christian Almesberger
- Editors: Joe Hobeck; Joseph Jett Sally; Fiona Colbeck
- Camera setup: Single-camera
- Running time: 46–151 minutes
- Production companies: Anarchos Productions (s. 1); Javelin Productions (s. 1); Studio JMS; Georgeville Television; Venus Castina LLC (s. 2); Elizabeth Bay Productions (s. 2); Unpronounceable Productions

Original release
- Network: Netflix
- Release: June 5, 2015 – June 8, 2018

Sense8 (/ˈsɛnseɪt/) is an American science fiction drama television series created by Lana and Lilly Wachowski and J. Michael Straczynski for Netflix. The production companies behind Sense8 included the Wachowskis' Anarchos Productions (replaced by Lana and her wife's Venus Castina Productions in the second season), Straczynski's Studio JMS, and Georgeville Television, with Unpronounceable Productions having been set up specifically for the show.

The show's first season introduced a multinational ensemble cast, with Aml Ameen, Doona Bae, Jamie Clayton, Tina Desai, Tuppence Middleton, Max Riemelt, Miguel Ángel Silvestre, and Brian J. Smith portraying eight strangers from different parts of the world who suddenly discover that they are "sensates": human beings who are mentally and emotionally linked. Freema Agyeman, Terrence Mann, Anupam Kher, Naveen Andrews, and Daryl Hannah also star. In the second season, Toby Onwumere replaces Ameen. The show explores issues related to identity, sexuality, gender, and politics that its creators felt had been rarely addressed on television. Its central theme is an embrace of empathy across difference.

All episodes of the first season of Sense8 were written by the Wachowskis and Straczynski; in the second season, Lilly Wachowski took a break from the show, and the episodes were written by just Lana Wachowski and Straczynski, with the exception of the series finale which was written by Lana, David Mitchell, and Aleksandar Hemon. Most episodes were directed by the Wachowskis (or just Lana in the second season), with the remainder being divided between their frequent collaborators James McTeigue, Tom Tykwer, and Dan Glass. Sense8 was filmed almost entirely on location in a multitude of cities around the world.

The first season, consisting of 12 episodes, became available for streaming on Netflix on June 5, 2015, and was met with generally favorable critical reception. It was praised for its representation of LGBTQ characters and themes, winning the GLAAD Media Award for Outstanding Drama Series. It was also recognized with a Location Managers Guild award for its use of locations as an integral part of the story, and a Primetime Emmy Award nomination for Outstanding Original Main Title Theme Music.

The second season began with a two-hour Christmas special in December 2016, with the remaining 10 episodes released in May 2017. However, the following month Netflix announced that they had cancelled the series, which had ended with a cliffhanger in expectation of a third season, then under negotiation. In response to criticism of the cancellation, especially with an unresolved story, Netflix produced a two-and-a-half-hour series finale that was released on June 8, 2018. The season was overall met with positive critical reception and received a Primetime Emmy Award nomination for Outstanding Cinematography for a Single-Camera Series (One Hour), and two nominations by the GLAAD Media Awards for Outstanding Drama Series and Outstanding TV Movie or Limited Series for the season proper and series finale, respectively.

== Plot ==
The story of Sense8 begins when the psychic connection of eight strangers of a variety of walks of life from different parts of the world is "birthed" by a woman called Angelica, who kills herself to avoid capture by a man called "Whispers". The eight discover that they form a cluster of "sensates": human beings who are mentally and emotionally linked, can sense and communicate with one another, and can share their knowledge, languages, and skills.

In the first season, the eight—Capheus, Sun, Nomi, Kala, Riley, Wolfgang, Lito, and Will—are shown trying to both live their everyday lives and figure out how and why they are connected. Meanwhile, a sensate named Jonas, who was involved with Angelica, comes to their aid, while the sinister Biologic Preservation Organization (BPO) and Whispers, a high-ranking sensate inside BPO, attempt to hunt them down.

In the second season, the eight have grown accustomed to their connection and help one another daily. They learn more about sensates and how to use (and temporarily suspend) their powers as well as the history and goals of BPO and Angelica's involvement with it. They also meet other sensates, not all of whom are friendly. At the same time, Jonas attempts to both aid them and look after himself after being captured by Whispers, who is now involved in a cat-and-mouse game with Will, each trying to outsmart the other.

In the series finale, the cluster and the people closest to them meet up in person to save Wolfgang who has been captured by BPO. To that end, the cluster has kidnapped Whispers and Jonas to use them as a bargaining chip and source of information, respectively. The heroes discover the personal motivations of the two men and Angelica, meet potential allies (both sensates and normal humans), and deal with the Chairman of BPO, who launches a global attack against sensates and their allies.

== Cast ==
=== The August 8th cluster ===
- Aml Ameen (season 1) and Toby Onwumere (season 2) as Capheus "Van Damn" Onyango, a matatu driver in Nairobi who is trying to earn money to buy HIV/AIDS medication for his mother.
- Doona Bae as Sun Bak, daughter of a powerful Seoul business executive and a burgeoning star in the underground kickboxing world.
- Jamie Clayton as Nomi Marks, a trans woman hacktivist and blogger living in San Francisco with her girlfriend Amanita.
- Tina Desai as Kala Dandekar, a university-educated pharmacist and devout Hindu in Mumbai who is engaged to marry a man she learns to love.
- Tuppence Middleton as Riley Blue (née Gunnarsdóttir), an Icelandic DJ living in London who is trying to escape a tragic past.
- Max Riemelt as Wolfgang Bogdanow, a Berlin locksmith and safe-cracker who has unresolved conflicts with his late father and participates in Russian organized crime.
- Miguel Ángel Silvestre as Lito Rodriguez, a closeted actor of Spanish background living in Mexico City with his boyfriend Hernando.
- Brian J. Smith as Will Gorski, a Chicago police officer haunted by an unsolved murder from his childhood.

=== Other regulars ===
- Freema Agyeman as Amanita "Neets" Caplan, Nomi's girlfriend, who later becomes an ally for the new sensates.
- Terrence Mann as Milton Bailey "Whispers" Brandt, (Note: Brandt is also known as "the cannibal", a reference to the fact that he killed his own cluster. He also uses many fake names, such as Dr. Matheson or Gibbons.) a sensate who turned against his own kind and who is a high-ranking member of the Biologic Preservation Organization (BPO), an organization determined to neutralize sensates.
- Anupam Kher as Sanyam Dandekar, Kala's loving father, a chef and restaurant owner.
- Naveen Andrews as Jonas Maliki, a sensate from a different cluster who wants to help the newly born cluster of sensates.
- Daryl Hannah as Angelica "Angel" Turing, a sensate from the same cluster as Jonas, who becomes the "mother" of the new sensates' cluster as she activates their psychic connection.

== Episodes ==
Season	Episodes		Originally released
1	12		June 5, 2015
2	12	1	December 23, 2016
2	12	10	May 5, 2017
2	12	1	June 8, 2018

=== Season 1 (2015) ===
No. overall	No. in season	Title	Directed by	Written by	Original release date
1	1	"Limbic Resonance"	The Wachowskis	The Wachowskis & J. Michael Straczynski	June 5, 2015
2	2	"I Am Also a We"	The Wachowskis	The Wachowskis & J. Michael Straczynski	June 5, 2015
3	3	"Smart Money Is on the Skinny Bitch"	The Wachowskis	The Wachowskis & J. Michael Straczynski	June 5, 2015
4	4	"What's Going On?"	Tom Tykwer	The Wachowskis & J. Michael Straczynski	June 5, 2015
5	5	"Art Is Like Religion"	James McTeigue	The Wachowskis & J. Michael Straczynski	June 5, 2015
6	6	"Demons"	The Wachowskis	The Wachowskis & J. Michael Straczynski	June 5, 2015
7	7	"W. W. N. Double D?"	James McTeigue	The Wachowskis & J. Michael Straczynski	June 5, 2015
8	8	"We Will All Be Judged by the Courage of Our Hearts"	Dan Glass	The Wachowskis & J. Michael Straczynski	June 5, 2015
9	9	"Death Doesn't Let You Say Goodbye"	The Wachowskis	The Wachowskis & J. Michael Straczynski	June 5, 2015
10	10	"What Is Human?"	The Wachowskis	The Wachowskis & J. Michael Straczynski	June 5, 2015
11	11	"Just Turn the Wheel and the Future Changes"	Tom Tykwer	The Wachowskis & J. Michael Straczynski	June 5, 2015
12	12	"I Can't Leave Her"	The Wachowskis	The Wachowskis & J. Michael Straczynski	June 5, 2015

=== Season 2 (2016–2018) ===
No. overall	No. in season	Title	Directed by	Written by	Original release date
Special
13	1	"Happy Fucking New Year." "A Christmas Special" (Note: The episode was originally announced and released as "A Christmas Special", but it was later renamed to "Happy Fucking New Year.")	Lana Wachowski	Lana Wachowski & J. Michael Straczynski	December 23, 2016
Season
14	2	"Who Am I?"	Lana Wachowski	Lana Wachowski & J. Michael Straczynski	May 5, 2017
15	3	"Obligate Mutualisms"	Lana Wachowski	Lana Wachowski & J. Michael Straczynski	May 5, 2017
16	4	"Polyphony"	James McTeigue	Lana Wachowski & J. Michael Straczynski	May 5, 2017
17	5	"Fear Never Fixed Anything"	James McTeigue	Lana Wachowski & J. Michael Straczynski	May 5, 2017
18	6	"Isolated Above, Connected Below"	Lana Wachowski	Lana Wachowski & J. Michael Straczynski	May 5, 2017
19	7	"I Have No Room in My Heart for Hate"	James McTeigue	Lana Wachowski & J. Michael Straczynski	May 5, 2017
20	8	"All I Want Right Now Is One More Bullet"	Dan Glass	Lana Wachowski & J. Michael Straczynski	May 5, 2017
21	9	"What Family Actually Means"	Lana Wachowski	Lana Wachowski & J. Michael Straczynski	May 5, 2017
22	10	"If All the World's a Stage, Identity Is Nothing But a Costume"	Tom Tykwer	Lana Wachowski & J. Michael Straczynski	May 5, 2017
23	11	"You Want a War?"	Lana Wachowski	Lana Wachowski & J. Michael Straczynski	May 5, 2017
Special
24	12	"Amor Vincit Omnia" (Note: Popular reordering of an excerpt from Virgil's Eclogue X, line 69, which the show translates to "Love conquers all things".)	Lana Wachowski	Lana Wachowski & David Mitchell & Aleksandar Hemon	June 8, 2018

== Production ==
=== Conception and development ===
According to the Wachowskis, the origins of Sense8 date back several years before the announcement of the show to "a late-night conversation about the ways technology simultaneously unites and divides us". When deciding to create a television series, Lana chose to brainstorm ideas with Straczynski because of his extensive experience working with the format, by inviting him to her house in San Francisco. After several days of discussion, they decided on creating a show that would explore the relationship between empathy and evolution in the human race, necessitating filming on location in several countries over the world. The title of the show was thought up by Lana on their second day of brainstorming, as a play on the word sensate and the notion of eight main characters.

On October 2, 2012, Variety first reported the existence of the show. The Wachowskis and Straczynski had written three hour-long spec scripts, and were attempting to shop them around. Their first meeting with potential buyers was with Netflix. The Wachowskis and Straczynski talked to them about subjects such as gender, identity, secrecy, and privacy. Netflix announced that they had ordered a 10-episode first season for the series on March 27, 2013, which during filming was extended to 12. Straczynski and the Wachowskis mapped out five seasons worth of stories for the series from the beginning, including the series' final episode. Lilly Wachowski, after completing her gender transition, decided to take some time off and did not return as writer or director for the second season, although she remained active as co-creator.

Producer Roberto Malerba has disclosed that the first season had an average budget of about $4.5 million per episode, and the second season $9 million per episode.

=== Writing ===
Initial writing for the first season was split between the Wachowskis and Straczynski. The show was transformed when they decided to limit the storytelling, with the exception of the opening scene of the first episode, to the perspective of the eight characters. Lana Wachowski, a trans woman, has written her first transgender character in her career in the series: Nomi Marks. For that she partly used her own experiences. Jamie Clayton, who plays Nomi, has provided the example of a scene where a young Nomi is bullied by boys in a gym shower, as a scene that was based on experiences from Lana's life. Freema Agyeman, who plays Nomi's girlfriend Amanita, has shared that her character was based heavily on Lana's wife, Karin Winslow.

Unlike the first season, where the Wachowskis and Straczynski split the number of scripts in half and worked remotely from each other, writing for the second season was performed by Lana and Straczynski by collaborating inside a shared writers' room. David Mitchell and Aleksandar Hemon worked as additional writers on the second season and were credited as "consultants". They spent a week in September 2015 with Lana, Straczynski, and script supervisor Julie Brown, proposing to them situations to be further developed by Lana and Straczynski. Later, once filming began, Lana did a lot of rewrites on a daily basis as she got inspired by the locations, actors, and so on, even on the set. When the series finale special was announced, Lana, Mitchell, and Hemon returned as writers.

=== Casting ===
On June 20, 2014, Deadline Hollywood announced the cast of the eight lead characters, along with Freema Agyeman, Naveen Andrews, Daryl Hannah, Alfonso Herrera, Eréndira Ibarra, and Terence Mann. For the roles of those characters living outside of America, the filmmakers wanted to assemble a cast of international actors that matched the nationality of their respective characters, if possible. For example, Doona Bae, Tina Desai, and Max Riemelt are from Seoul, Mumbai, and Berlin like their respective characters. Jamie Clayton is a trans woman like the character she plays. In November, Deadline Hollywood wrote that Christian Oliver had joined the cast as a recurring villain.

On April 26, 2016, Deadline Hollywood reported that Aml Ameen abruptly left production a couple of episodes into filming of the second season over a conflict with Lana Wachowski that started during the table read for the season and progressively got worse. Subsequent to Ameen's departure, the role of Capheus was recast to Toby Onwumere after a seven-day auditioning process. Earlier in April, Kick Gurry revealed he had been cast in the second season. In May, Deadline Hollywood reported Ben Cole had been cast as Todd, a sensate who would rather be "normal". In September, Sylvester McCoy reportedly revealed he filmed three or four episodes of the second season.

=== Filming and cinematography ===
To properly tell the international aspects of the story, filming for Sense8 took place almost entirely on location around the globe. In the first season, filming took place in nine cities located in eight countries: Berlin, Chicago, London, Mexico City, Mumbai, Nairobi, Reykjavík, San Francisco, and Seoul. Production began on June 18, 2014, in San Francisco. The production participated in the San Francisco "Scene in San Francisco Incentive Program" administered by the San Francisco Film Commission. The writers wanted to feature an event in each city. They were able to schedule the Pride scenes with its Dykes on Bikes on the Dyke March in San Francisco, the Fourth of July fireworks celebration in Chicago, and the Ganesha Chaturthi Hindu festival in Mumbai. Filming wrapped in Iceland on January 21, 2015. By the end of the shooting, the filmmakers had completed 100,000 miles (160,000 km) of flight time, or four times around the globe.

For the second season, production credited 16 cities located in 11 countries for having been part of the filming. The major locations they filmed in include all of the first season's except Reykjavík, and the following new ones: Amsterdam, Argyll, Chippenham, Los Angeles, Malta, Positano, Redwoods, and São Paulo. Production start for the main unit of the second season was given an expected date of March 2016, but a separate shoot involving the principal actors began on December 30, 2015, in Berlin, to capture footage during the Christmas holidays. Main unit filming resumed in Berlin in the middle of March 2016. In São Paulo, they filmed unrehearsed in front of a crowd of millions in its 20th Gay Pride Parade. In Amsterdam, they were the first production to film in the Rijksmuseum. On September 19, 2016, with the completion of the Malta shoot, filming for the second season came to an end. Overall, the cast and crew flew in excess of 250,000 miles (400,000 km) to complete the season. Filming for the series finale took place in Berlin, Brussels, Naples, and Paris. Production began in Berlin on October 2, 2017. In Paris, they filmed a four-minute fireworks show near the Eiffel Tower. Filming wrapped in Berlin on November 12, 2017.

Netflix required the production to shoot with 4K resolution cameras to make the look of the show future-proof. During the first season, cinematographer John Toll, once again collaborating with the Wachowskis after Cloud Atlas and Jupiter Ascending, personally handled the cinematography in San Francisco, Chicago, London, Iceland, and Seoul. In the second season he handled the majority of the locations. Additional cinematographers worked with the rest of the directors in the remaining locations. James McTeigue worked with Danny Ruhlman, and Tom Tykwer worked with Frank Griebe and Christian Almesberger. Toll returned as cinematographer for the series finale, teaming up again with Lana.

Toll's cinematography in the third episode of the second season was recognized with a nomination for Outstanding Cinematography for a Single-Camera Series (One Hour) during the 69th Primetime Creative Arts Emmy Awards.

=== Directing ===
The show's directors were attached to locations instead of episodes and with several countries appearing in every episode, in reality none of them has a singular director. During the first season, the Wachowskis were responsible for directorial duties in scenes shot in Chicago, San Francisco, London, and Iceland. McTeigue worked on the Mexico City and Mumbai parts along with some in Reykjavík, and Tykwer helmed Berlin and Nairobi. Dan Glass made his directorial debut in the Seoul part of the story. In total, the Wachowskis were credited for directing seven episodes, McTeigue and Tykwer two each, and Glass one.

In the second season, Lana Wachowski took over many of the filmmaking aspects of the show. Production sound mixer Stevie Haywood recounted Lana's directing style was to use two cameras as the default setup, and develop the shot over "enormously long takes" which could last up to fifteen to twenty minutes. McTeigue returned as director for Mexico City, and Tykwer for the Nairobi parts. According to Glass, in the second season he directed the second unit in Seoul, and he also did some directing in Berlin. Overall, six episodes of the second season, including the Christmas special and series finale, credit Lana as director, three credit McTeigue, and Tykwer and Glass get credited each in one.

=== Effects and post-production ===
Seoul unit director Dan Glass and Jim Mitchell were the visual effects supervisors of the first season. The season had a total VFX shot count of about 1200. An in-house VFX team was established in Chicago which completed over 700 shots. The major external VFX vendors were Locktix VFX (160–180 shots), Technicolor VFX (over 100 shots), and Encore VFX. Because of the series' tight budget and timeline the production made the decision to do most of the effects, including the telepathy scenes, in-camera and only enhance them digitally where appropriate. Technicolor provided dailies and worked with cinematographer John Toll and the Wachowskis to color grade the show. Technicolor finished the show in 4K and delivered both 2K and 4K masters.

In the second season, the visual effects supervisors were Dan Glass and Ryan Urban. Technicolor were again responsible for managing dailies and color grading the show, while their VFX department delivered over 600 shots for the first 11 episodes, and an additional 109 for the series finale. Sense8 was edited in the Wachowskis' headquarters in Chicago, Kinowerks, by Joe Hobeck and Joseph Jett Sally in the first season and by Sally and Fiona Colbeck in the second.

=== Music and title sequence ===
The score of Sense8 was composed by Johnny Klimek and Tom Tykwer, with additional contributions by Gabriel Isaac Mounsey, and recorded by the MDR Leipzig Radio Symphony Orchestra. Each season's score was written up to a year and a half before filming began, enabling the production to play it back to the actors before shooting a scene. A soundtrack album for the first season was released digitally by WaterTower Music on May 5, 2017. It includes 10 tracks by Klimek and Tykwer. For the second season, Klimek and Tykwer provided the editorial team with about 10 "mother" themes, each with a length of over five minutes, before filming began. In the Christmas special episode "Happy F*cking New Year", a cover of Leonard Cohen's "Hallelujah" is featured, which was arranged by Gary Fry and recorded by the Apollo Chorus of Chicago, with the lead vocalist being Daniel Martin Moore. The episode also featured a Matstubs remix of "I'd Love To Change The World".

The theme music of Sense8 was picked by the Wachowskis from the two hours of original music Tykwer and Klimek had written. The show received a nomination for Outstanding Original Main Title Theme Music during the 68th Primetime Creative Arts Emmy Awards. For the series almost two-minute long title sequence, Karin Winslow rented a car and with the help of a camera assistant traveled in the eight featured countries of the first season and captured over a hundred shots. "My directive from Lana was to go out and describe each country by what you see; find the nuances, find the food, find what people are doing, get a feel for the place," said Winslow. For the second season, and again for the finale, some of the footage was replaced by new shots.

=== Cancellation and future ===
On June 1, 2017, Netflix cancelled the series after two seasons. Later that month, Chief Content Officer of Netflix Ted Sarandos during his talk on Produced By Conference, commented that the show was cancelled because its audience, despite being very passionate, was not large enough to support the high production costs. As a response to the cancellation, fans created online petitions, called Netflix, and tweeted #RenewSense8 and other hashtags, in an attempt to bring back the show. On June 29, 2017, the official social media accounts of the show posted a letter by Lana Wachowski which announced the release of a two-hour special for 2018. The special was released on June 8, 2018.

Netflix billed the second special in their announcement as the series finale, but Wachowski left open the future of Sense8 past the special's release. On August 5, 2017, during a Facebook Live with Wachowski and the cast about the show's revival, Wachowski joked that because she believed that the fans of the show would go and create more fans, she was writing the entire third season. A few days later, Brian J. Smith said during an interview that he believed if "a truly eyebrow-raising amount of people" watched the special, they would make more. Conversely, shortly after the special's release, executive producer Grant Hill said that they followed Netflix's directive to design it as the series finale, and that there have not been any talks about the possibility of another revival.

Straczynski and Hemon have shared some hints about the character trajectories that were planned for a third season and beyond.

== Reception ==
=== Critical reception ===
Critical reception of the first season of Sense8 has been generally favorable. Rotten Tomatoes, a review aggregator website, reported a 71% critical approval rating with an average rating of 6.25/10 based on 62 reviews. The website's critical consensus reads, "Some of the scenarios border on illogical, but the diverse characters and the creative intersections between their stories keep the Wachowskis' Sense8 compelling." On Metacritic, which uses a weighted average, the season is assigned a score of 64 out of 100, based on 24 critics, indicating "generally favorable reviews".

Sense8 continued to be positively received in its second season. Rotten Tomatoes indexed 15 reviews for the early released Christmas special, and reported an 87% critical approval rating for it, with an average rating of 6.88/10. The website assigned the following consensus to the special: "Sense8 serves up a heaping helping of yuletide queerness and sci-fi slyness in this narratively messy but richly felt special." Based on 28 reviews, Rotten Tomatoes assigned the 10 episodes that followed the special a critical approval rating of 93%, with an average rating of 7.57/10. The critical consensus reads, "Sense8 maintains its stunning visuals, Wachowski wackiness, and great heart — though its individual characters deserve more development." On Metacritic, the season was assigned a score of 73 out of 100, based on 8 critics, indicating "generally favorable reviews". Rotten Tomatoes also collected 28 reviews for the series finale, and calculated a 93% critical approval rating, and an average rating of 7.15/10. The finale's critical consensus reads, "A hard fought coda to a beloved series, Sense8's epilogue exemplifies its strange, sensual, somewhat silly delights."

In a report released by Netflix, it was discovered that at least 70% of the viewers that watched up to the third episode ended up watching the entire first season, and Straczynski was told there are people that watch it "straight through – three, four, six times." In another report released by Netflix, Sense8 was listed among the shows whose viewers tend to heavily binge-watch their first seasons, rather than savoring their episodes by watching them at a slower pace. Netflix's Chief Content Officer Ted Sarandos praised the success of Sense8 in the up-and-coming French and German markets but also globally. Vice president of international series for Netflix Erik Barmack has named Sense8 one of the most popular Netflix series in the Brazilian market. Less than three days after the premiere of the first season, Variety reported that it had been pirated more than half a million times, regardless of the series' digital distribution. Netflix also placed the second season of Sense8 at fifth place on their list for the year 2017 about couples where one of the two cannot resist the urge to watch, and ends up watching episodes ahead of their significant other.

Former Colombian President and 2016 Nobel Peace Prize recipient Juan Manuel Santos heavily referenced Sense8 in a speech he made in April 2019 during the graduation ceremony of students of the University of Los Andes who participated in the Ser Pilo Paga program. Santos recited the basic premise of the show about the fictional species Homo sensorium who can feel empathy for one another, and expressed his wish and belief that one day humanity will be the same, "united in diversity and tolerance".

Critics and writers such as David Barr Kirtley have commented on the influence of Theodore Sturgeon's novel More Than Human on Sense8, even calling it, "the Theodore Sturgeon adaptation we always wanted."

=== Accolades ===
Year	Award	Category	Recipient(s)	Result	Ref(s)
2015	Camerimage	First Look – TV Pilots Competition	Lana Wachowski and Lilly Wachowski (directors), Christian Almesberger, Frank Griebe, Danny Ruhlmann and John Toll (cinematographers) (for: "Limbic Resonance")	Nominated	
2016	Dorian Awards	LGBTQ TV Show of the Year	Sense8	Nominated	
2016	Dorian Awards	Campy TV Show of the Year	Sense8	Nominated	
2016	GLAAD Media Awards	Outstanding Drama Series	Sense8	Won	
2016	HPA Awards	Outstanding Color Grading – Television	Tony Dustin (for: "What's Going On?")	Nominated	
2016	Location Managers Guild Awards	Outstanding Locations in a Contemporary Television Series	Marco Giacalone and Bill Bowling	Won	
2016	Saturn Awards	Best New Media Television Series	Sense8	Nominated	
2016	Primetime Creative Arts Emmy Awards	Outstanding Original Main Title Theme Music	Johnny Klimek and Tom Tykwer	Nominated	
2017	Primetime Creative Arts Emmy Awards	Outstanding Cinematography for a Single-Camera Series (One Hour)	John Toll (for: "Obligate Mutualisms")	Nominated	
2018	Dorian Awards	LGBTQ TV Show of the Year	Sense8	Nominated	
2018	GLAAD Media Awards	Outstanding Drama Series	Sense8	Nominated	
2019	Producers Guild of America Awards	Outstanding Producer of Streamed or Televised Motion Pictures	Marcus Loges, Alex Boden, Roberto Malerba, Terry Needham, John Toll, Lana Wachowski, J. Michael Straczynski, and Grant Hill (for: "Together Until the End") (Note: The actual title of the nominated episode—and series finale—is "Amor Vincit Omnia", for which Netflix used the "Together Until The End" tagline to promote it.)	Nominated	
2019	GLAAD Media Awards	Outstanding TV Movie or Limited Series	Sense8	Nominated	

== Marketing ==
The red carpet premiere of Sense8 took place on May 27, 2015, in San Francisco's AMC Metreon, where the first three episodes were previewed. Starting in the middle of July 2015, Netflix Brazil released a series of documentary shorts called Sense8: Decoded. Inspired by Sense8 and directed by João Wainer, the shorts briefly touch upon subjects such as psychiatry, feminism, being transgender and Buddhism. Later in the month, Netflix released a music track titled Brainwave Symphony on Spotify. To produce it they subjected eight strangers to a series of various stimuli and they recorded their individual brainwaves using EEG sensors. After extracting a melody from each of them they arranged them in a way to produce a track which mirrors the escalating action of the season. In early August 2015, Netflix made available Sense8: Creating the World, a half-hour streaming television documentary, shot around the world, about the making of the first season of the series.

On May 3, 2016, publicity stills of the ongoing production of the second season were posted online, accompanied by a short message by Lana Wachowski introducing the #Road2Sense8 hashtag under which new pictures would be posted. On December 3, 2016, the Christmas special episode was screened at São Paulo's Comic Con Experience, in advance of its Netflix premiere on December 23. The second episode of the second season was screened out of competition during the Series Mania festival in Paris, on April 18, 2017. On April 23, a screening of the second and third episodes took place in Chicago's Music Box Theatre, in a benefit for the American Civil Liberties Union, followed by Lana Wachowski taking questions from the audience, and again on April 26, in the red carpet premiere of the second season, at New York City's AMC Lincoln Square.

Several screenings of the series finale took place prior to its release on Netflix, on June 8, 2018. The first screening took place in The Music Box Theatre in Chicago, on May 25, as a benefit for EMILY's List, followed by a Q&A session with Lana and select cast members. The second screening took place in the Latin America Memorial in São Paulo, on June 1, with several cast members attending. The red carpet premiere followed in ArcLight Hollywood, in Los Angeles, on June 7. Linda Perry made a guest appearance to perform "What's Up?". Netflix organized an event for the fans on the day of the special's release, June 8, in Posillipo, in Naples, where a big portion of the special was filmed. Among other things, fans could try a slice of a special "Sense8" pizza that was created by famous pizzaiolo Gino Sorbillo with the help of the cast.
