= Onwumere =

Onwumere // is a surname of Igbo origin. It means “death caused it”. Notable people with the surname include:

- Ngozi Onwumere (born 1992), American–Nigerian sprinter and bobsledder
- Sidney Onwubere (born 1993), Filipino-Nigerian basketball player
- Toby Onwumere (born 1990), Nigerian-born American actor
