= John Toll =

American cinematographer

- Born: June 15, 1952 (age 74); Cleveland, Ohio, U.S.
- Occupation: Cinematographer
- Years active: 1971–present
- Organization: American Society of Cinematographers
- Spouse: Lois Burwell (m. 1998)

John Toll, ASC (born June 15, 1952) is an American cinematographer, with a filmography that spans a wide variety of genres, including epic period drama, comedy, science fiction, and contemporary drama. He won the Academy Award for Best Cinematography twice, for Legends of the Fall in 1994, and Braveheart in 1995, making him 1 of 4 cinematographers to win back-to-back Oscars.

== Life and career ==
Born in Cleveland, Ohio, Toll began working as camera operator on film Norma Rae. He was also nominated for an Academy Award for his work on The Thin Red Line and won an Honorable Mention at the 49th Berlin International Film Festival. In addition to film, Toll has shot several commercials, the pilot episode of Breaking Bad, and served as chief cinematographer on the Netflix series Sense8.

== Personal life ==
Toll is married to the British make-up artist Lois Burwell, who had also won an Oscar for Braveheart.

== Filmography ==
=== Film ===
Year	Title	Director	Notes
1971	The Young Graduates	Robert Anderson	With J. Barry Herron
1972	The Hoax	Robert Anderson	
1975	Chrysler Carnival	Neil Tardio	Short film
1985	The Beach Boys: An American Band	Malcolm Leo	Documentary film
1991	The Forfeit	Kate Hall	
1992	Wind	Carroll Ballard	
1994	Legends of the Fall	Edward Zwick	
1995	Braveheart	Mel Gibson	
1996	Jack	Francis Ford Coppola	
1997	The Rainmaker	Francis Ford Coppola	
1998	The Thin Red Line	Terrence Malick	
1999	Simpatico	Matthew Warchus	
2000	Almost Famous	Cameron Crowe	
2001	Captain Corelli's Mandolin	John Madden	
2001	Vanilla Sky	Cameron Crowe	
2003	The Last Samurai	Edward Zwick	
2005	Elizabethtown	Cameron Crowe	
2006	Seraphim Falls	David Von Ancken	
2007	Rise: Blood Hunter	Sebastian Gutierrez	
2007	Gone Baby Gone	Ben Affleck	
2008	Tropic Thunder	Ben Stiller	
2009	It's Complicated	Nancy Meyers	
2011	The Adjustment Bureau	George Nolfi	
2012	The Odd Life of Timothy Green	Peter Hedges	
2012	Cloud Atlas	The Wachowskis; Tom Tykwer	With Frank Griebe
2013	Iron Man 3	Shane Black	
2015	Jupiter Ascending	The Wachowskis	
2016	Billy Lynn's Long Halftime Walk	Ang Lee	
2019	Harriet	Kasi Lemmons	
2021	The Matrix Resurrections	Lana Wachowski	With Daniele Massaccesi
2023	80 for Brady	Kyle Marvin	

=== Television ===
Year	Title	Director	Notes
1988	Hiroshima Maiden	Joan Darling	TV special
1989	The Young Riders	Robert Lieberman	Episode "The Kid"
2008	Breaking Bad	Vince Gilligan	Episode "Pilot"
2015-2018	Sense8	The Wachowskis; James McTeigue; Tom Tykwer; Dan Glass	24 episodes (With Christian Almesberger, Frank Griebe and Danny Ruhlmann); Also credited as executive producer (12 episodes)

== Awards and nominations ==
Academy Awards

Year	Title	Category	Result
1994	Legends of the Fall	Best Cinematography	Won
1995	Braveheart	Best Cinematography	Won
1998	The Thin Red Line	Best Cinematography	Nominated

BAFTA Awards

Year	Title	Category	Result
1995	Braveheart	Best Cinematography	Won

Satellite Awards

Year	Title	Category	Result
1998	The Thin Red Line	Best Cinematography	Won
2003	The Last Samurai	Best Cinematography	Won
2016	Billy Lynn's Long Halftime Walk	Best Cinematography	Nominated

American Society of Cinematographers

Year	Title	Category	Result
1994	Legends of the Fall	Outstanding Achievement in Cinematography	Nominated
1995	Braveheart	Outstanding Achievement in Cinematography	Won
1998	The Thin Red Line	Outstanding Achievement in Cinematography	Won
2003	The Last Samurai	Outstanding Achievement in Cinematography	Nominated
2016	Lifetime Achievement Award		Won

Primetime Emmy Awards

Year	Title	Category	Result
2008	Breaking Bad	Outstanding Cinematography for a Series (One Hour) (For episode "Pilot")	Nominated

Other awards

Year	Title	Awards	Result
1994	Legends of the Fall	Dallas–Fort Worth Film Critics Association Award for Best Cinematography	Won
1995	Braveheart	Dallas–Fort Worth Film Critics Association Award for Best Cinematography	Won
1998	The Thin Red Line	Berlin International Film Festival Honorable Mention	Won
1998	The Thin Red Line	New York Film Critics Circle Award for Best Cinematographer	Won
1998	The Thin Red Line	BSC Award for Best Cinematography in a Feature Film	Nominated
1998	The Thin Red Line	Chlotrudis Award for Best Cinematography	Nominated
1998	The Thin Red Line	Chicago Film Critics Association Award for Best Cinematography	Nominated
1998	The Thin Red Line	National Society of Film Critics Award for Best Cinematography	Nominated
1998	The Thin Red Line	Online Film Critics Society Award for Best Cinematography	Nominated
2003	The Last Samurai	Hollywood Film Award for Outstanding Achievement in Cinematography	Won
2003	The Last Samurai	Online Film Critics Society Award for Best Cinematography	Nominated
2012	Cloud Atlas	German Film Award for Best Cinematography	Won
2012	Cloud Atlas	St. Louis Film Critics Association Award for Best Cinematography	Nominated
2019	Harriet	Black Reel Award for Outstanding Cinematography	Nominated
