= Paul Brincat =

Australian sound engineer (died 2025)

- Died: 1 June 2025
- Occupation: Sound engineer
- Years active: 1971–2025

Paul Brincat (died 1 June 2025) was an Australian sound engineer. He was nominated for an Academy Award in the category Best Sound for the film The Thin Red Line. Brincat worked on more than 40 films from 1971. He won an Emmy Award for Outstanding Sound Mixing for his work on the television series Flipper. Brincat died from a brain tumour on 1 June 2025.

== Selected filmography ==
- The Thin Red Line (1998)
