= The Thin Red Line (1998 film) =

War film by Terrence Malick

- Theatrical release poster
- Directed by: Terrence Malick
- Screenplay by: Terrence Malick
- Based on: The Thin Red Line (1962 novel) by James Jones
- Produced by: Robert Michael Geisler; John Roberdeau; Grant Hill
- Starring: Sean Penn; Adrien Brody; Jim Caviezel; Ben Chaplin; George Clooney; John Cusack; Woody Harrelson; Elias Koteas; Nick Nolte; John C. Reilly; John Travolta
- Cinematography: John Toll
- Edited by: Billy Weber; Leslie Jones; Saar Klein
- Music by: Hans Zimmer
- Production companies: Fox 2000 Pictures; Phoenix Pictures; Geisler-Roberdeau
- Distributed by: 20th Century Fox
- Release dates: December 22, 1998 (Beverly Hills); December 23, 1998; (limited)
- Running time: 170 minutes
- Country: United States
- Language: English
- Budget: $52 million
- Box office: $98.1 million

The Thin Red Line is a 1998 American war film written and directed by Terrence Malick. It is the second film adaptation of the 1962 novel by James Jones, following the 1964 film. Telling a fictionalized version of the Battle of Mount Austen, which was part of the Guadalcanal campaign in the Pacific Theater of the Second World War, it portrays U.S. soldiers of C Company, 1st Battalion, 27th Infantry Regiment, 25th Infantry Division, played by Sean Penn, Jim Caviezel, Nick Nolte, Elias Koteas, and Ben Chaplin. The novel's title alludes to the stand of the 93rd Regiment in the Battle of Balaclava of the Crimean War.

The film marked Malick's return to filmmaking after a 20-year absence. It co-stars Adrien Brody, George Clooney, John Cusack, Woody Harrelson, Jared Leto, John C. Reilly, and John Travolta. Reportedly, the first assembled cut took seven months to edit and ran five hours. By the final cut, footage of performances by Bill Pullman, Lukas Haas, and Mickey Rourke had been removed (one of Rourke's scenes was included in the special features outtakes of the Criterion Blu-ray and DVD release). The film was scored by Hans Zimmer and shot by John Toll. Principal photography took place in Queensland, Australia and in the Solomon Islands.

20th Century Fox premiered The Thin Red Line in Beverly Hills on December 22, 1998, and released it in a limited release on December 23, 1998, before a nationwide release on January 15, 1999, and grossed $98 million against a $52 million budget. The film received positive reviews, with critics praising its philosophical depiction of war, Malick's direction and screenplay, musical score, cinematography, editing, and performances of the cast. The film was nominated for seven Academy Awards: Best Picture, Best Director, Best Adapted Screenplay, Best Cinematography, Best Film Editing, Best Original Score, and Best Sound. It won the Golden Bear at the 1999 Berlin International Film Festival. Martin Scorsese ranked it as his second-favorite film of the 1990s. On At the Movies, Gene Siskel called it "the finest contemporary war film I've seen."

== Plot ==
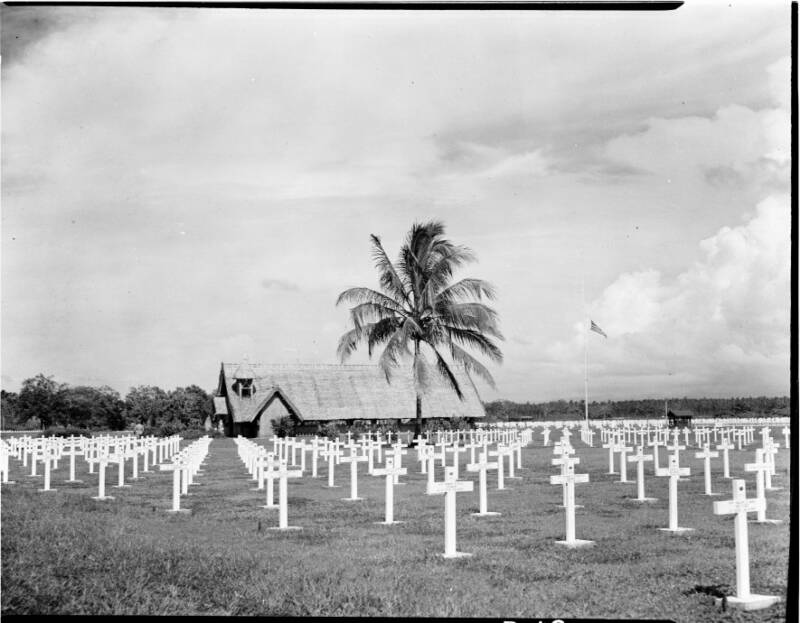
Guadalcanal cemetery, 1945

In November 1942, United States Army Private Witt goes AWOL from his unit to live among the carefree Melanesian natives in the South Pacific. He is found and imprisoned on a troopship by First Sergeant Welsh of his company. Witt is not allowed to rejoin his unit, and is instead punitively assigned to act as a stretcher bearer for the upcoming campaign.

The following month, the men of C Company, 1st Battalion, 27th Infantry Regiment, 25th Infantry Division, have been brought to the island of Guadalcanal as reinforcements in the campaign to secure Henderson Field, seize the island from the Japanese, and block off their route to Australia. C Company is commanded by Capt. James Staros. As they wait in the hold of a Navy transport ship, they contemplate their lives and the upcoming invasion.

The company lands on Guadalcanal unopposed. They march into the interior of the island, and along the way encounter natives and evidence of the ongoing Japanese presence. The company soon finds its objective: Hill 210, a key enemy position.

The attack commences at dawn the next day. Charlie Company storms up the hill, but is immediately repelled by heavy machine-gun fire. One group, a squad led by Sergeant Keck, hides behind a knoll safe from enemy fire "to await reinforcements". When they are fired upon, Keck reaches for a grenade on his belt and accidentally pulls the pin, then throws himself back on the grenade so that he will be the only one killed by the blast. At another point, Sergeant Welsh attempts to rescue a dying soldier, only to provide him with enough morphine to put him out of his misery.

Lt. Col. Gordon Tall orders Staros over the field telephone to capture the bunker by frontal assault, at whatever cost. Staros balks, stating that he will not commit his men to what he sees as a suicide mission. Meanwhile, Pvt. Bell covertly scouts the summit of the hill by himself and assesses the Japanese stronghold.

Furious at Staros's refusal to obey his command, Tall ventures up to Charlie Company's position, accompanied by his battalion executive officer, Captain John Gaff. When they arrive, they find that the Japanese resistance seems to have lessened, and Tall's opinion of Staros is sealed. After being advised of Bell's reconnaissance of the Japanese position, Tall suggests a small detachment of men to perform a flanking maneuver on the bunker to capture it. Among the men to volunteer for the mission are Pvts. Witt, Doll, and Bell. Captain Gaff is given command of the detachment, and they proceed up the hill toward the bunker. A fierce battle ensues, but ultimately the American forces are victorious, and the hill is captured.

For their efforts, the men are given a week's leave, though they find little joy in the respite in the fighting. While the company is bivouacked, Staros is relieved of his command by Tall, who deems him too soft for the pressures of combat and suggests that he apply for reassignment and become a lawyer in the JAG Corps in Washington, D.C. During this time, Bell receives a letter from his wife, informing him that she has fallen in love with another man and seeks a divorce. Witt, meanwhile, comes across some of the locals and notices that they have grown distant and distrustful of outsiders, and regularly quarrel with each other.

The company is sent on patrol up a river under the command of Lieutenant Band. Witt, along with Cpl. Fife, and Pvt. Coombs, scout upriver and encounter an advancing Japanese column. As they attempt to retreat, Coombs is wounded and ultimately drowns attempting to cross the riverbank. Witt draws away the Japanese to buy time for Fife, but he is encircled by one of their squads. The Japanese demand Witt surrender, but he raises his rifle and is killed. His body is buried by his squadmates, including a visibly grieving Sgt. Welsh. The company soon receives a new commander, Captain Bosche. They are relieved of duty and evacuated from Guadalcanal by a waiting LCT.

== Cast ==
- Sean Penn as 1st Sgt. Edward Welsh
- Adrien Brody as Cpl./Sgt. Geoffrey Fife
- Jim Caviezel as Pvt. Robert E. Lee Witt
- Ben Chaplin as Pvt./Sgt Jack Bell
- George Clooney as Capt. Charles Bosche
- John Cusack as Capt. John Gaff
- Woody Harrelson as Sgt. Keck
- Elias Koteas as Capt. James Staros
- Jared Leto as 2nd Lt. William Whyte
- Dash Mihok as Pfc. Don Doll
- Tim Blake Nelson as Pvt. Tills
- Nick Nolte as Lt. Col. Gordon Tall
- John C. Reilly as Sgt. Maynard Storm
- Larry Romano as Pvt. Mazzi
- John Savage as Sgt. McCron
- John Travolta as Brig. Gen. Quintard
- Arie Verveen as Pfc. Charlie Dale
- John Dee Smith as Pvt. Edward P. Train

Beyond these numerous top-billed cast members, the ensemble included appearances in smaller roles by many other well-known actors, including Kirk Acevedo as Pvt. Alfredo Tella, Penny Allen as Witt's Mother, Mark Boone Junior as Pvt Peale, Matt Doran as Pvt Coombs, Don Harvey as Sgt. Becker, Danny Hoch as Pvt. Carni, Thomas Jane as Pvt. Ash, Miranda Otto as Marty Bell, and Nick Stahl as Pvt. Beade.

Lukas Haas, Bill Pullman, Donal Logue and Mickey Rourke were also part of the film, but their scenes were ultimately cut. Billy Bob Thornton recorded hours of narration audio that was not used.

John Cusack's character, Captain Gaff, was based on the real figure of Charles W. Davis, who was awarded the Medal of Honor on Guadalcanal. The scene in which Gaff leads an attack on a Japanese bunker was inspired by the action for which Davis earned his Medal of Honor.

== Production ==
=== Screenplay ===
New York-based producer Bobby Geisler first approached Malick in 1978 and asked him to direct a film adaptation of David Rabe's play In the Boom Boom Room. Malick declined the offer, but instead discussed the idea of a film about the life of Joseph Merrick. Once word got out about David Lynch's film of The Elephant Man, he shelved the idea. In 1988, Geisler and John Roberdeau met with Malick in Paris about writing and directing a movie based on D. M. Thomas' 1981 novel The White Hotel. Malick declined, but told them that he would be willing instead to write either an adaptation of Molière's Tartuffe, or of James Jones' The Thin Red Line. The producers chose the latter and paid Malick $250,000 to write a screenplay.

Malick began adapting The Thin Red Line on January 1, 1989. Five months later, the producers received his first draft, which was 300 pages long. In 1990, Malick met with James Jones' widow Gloria and Jones' daughter Kaylie about adapting The Thin Red Line into a film. The producers spent a lot of time talking with Malick about his vision of the film. Geisler said,

Malick's Guadalcanal would be a Paradise Lost, an Eden, raped by the green poison, as Terry used to call it, of war. Much of the violence was to be portrayed indirectly. A soldier is shot, but rather than showing a Spielbergian bloody face we see a tree explode, the shredded vegetation, and a gorgeous bird with a broken wing flying out of a tree.

Malick spent years working on other projects, including a stage production of Sansho the Bailiff and a script known as The English-Speaker, spending $2 million of the producers' money, half of which for writing. According to an article in Entertainment Weekly, the producers gained Malick's confidence by "catering to his every whim," providing him with obscure research material, including a book titled Reptiles and Amphibians of Australia, an audiotape of Kodō's Heartbeat Drummers of Japan, information on the Navajo code talkers recruited by the United States Marine Corps, making his travel plans, and helping the director and his wife Michele get a mortgage for their Paris apartment.

By January 1995, Geisler and Roberdeau were broke and pressured Malick to decide which project he would complete. They approached Malick's former agent, Mike Medavoy, who was setting up his own production company, Phoenix Pictures, and he agreed to give them $100,000 to start work on The Thin Red Line. Medavoy had a deal with Sony Pictures and Malick began scouting locations in Panama and Costa Rica before settling on the rain forests of northern Australia. In April 1997, three months before filming, Sony pulled the plug while crews were building the sets in Queensland, because new studio chairman John Calley did not think Malick could make his movie with the proposed $52 million budget. Malick traveled to Los Angeles with Medavoy to pitch the project to various studios. 20th Century Fox agreed to put up $39 million of the budget with the stipulation that Malick cast five movie stars from a list of 10 who were interested. Pioneer Films, a Japanese company, contributed $8 million to the budget, and Phoenix Pictures added $3 million.

=== Casting ===
Casting for the film became a hot topic. When Sean Penn met Malick, he told him, "Give me a dollar and tell me where to show up." Scripts were also sent to Robert De Niro, Robert Duvall and Tom Cruise. In 1995, once word went out that Malick was making another movie after many years, numerous actors approached him, flooding the casting directors until they had to announce they wouldn't be accepting more requests. Some A-list actors including Brad Pitt, Al Pacino, Gary Oldman, and George Clooney offered to work for a fraction and some even offered to work for free. Bruce Willis even went as far as offering to pay for first-class tickets for the casting crew, to get a few lines for the movie. At Medavoy's home in 1995, Malick staged a reading with Martin Sheen delivering the screen directions, and Kevin Costner, Will Patton, Peter Berg, Lukas Haas, and Dermot Mulroney playing the main roles. In June of that year, a five-day workshop was scheduled at Medavoy's with Pitt dropping by, and culminating with Malick putting on the soundtrack of Where Eagles Dare and playing Japanese taiko drums. Malick met with an interested Johnny Depp about the project at the Book Soup Bistro on the Sunset Strip.

Edward Norton flew out to Austin and met Malick, who had been impressed by the actor's screen test for Primal Fear. Matthew McConaughey reportedly took a day off filming A Time to Kill to see Malick. Others followed, including William Baldwin, Edward Burns, Josh Hartnett, Crispin Glover, Philip Seymour Hoffman, Stephen Dorff, and Leonardo DiCaprio; the last of these flew up from the Mexico set of Romeo + Juliet to meet Malick at the American Airlines lounge in the Austin airport. Before the casting was finalized, Nicolas Cage had lunch with Malick in Hollywood in February 1996. Malick went off to scout locations and tried calling Cage that summer only to find out that his phone number had been disconnected. Tom Sizemore, however, was offered a more substantial role in Saving Private Ryan and, when he could not contact Malick for several days, decided to do Steven Spielberg's film instead. Actors Bill Pullman, Mickey Rourke, and Lukas Haas filmed scenes for the movie but were cut from the final film due to time constraints. Publicity stills of Pullman (as Sgt. MacTae, in a scene opposite Brody and Chaplin) can be seen online, Haas is pictured in the booklet of the CD soundtrack, and one of Rourke's scenes was restored for the Criterion Blu-Ray/DVD release of the film. Malick wrote a part specifically for Oldman, but the character was eventually scrapped before production began due to too many characters being in the film. He was later thanked in the credits along with Lukas, Viggo Mortensen, Sheen, Rourke, Pullman and Jason Patric.

James Caviezel, who was cast as Private Witt, credits Malick's casting of him as the turning point in his career.

=== Principal photography ===
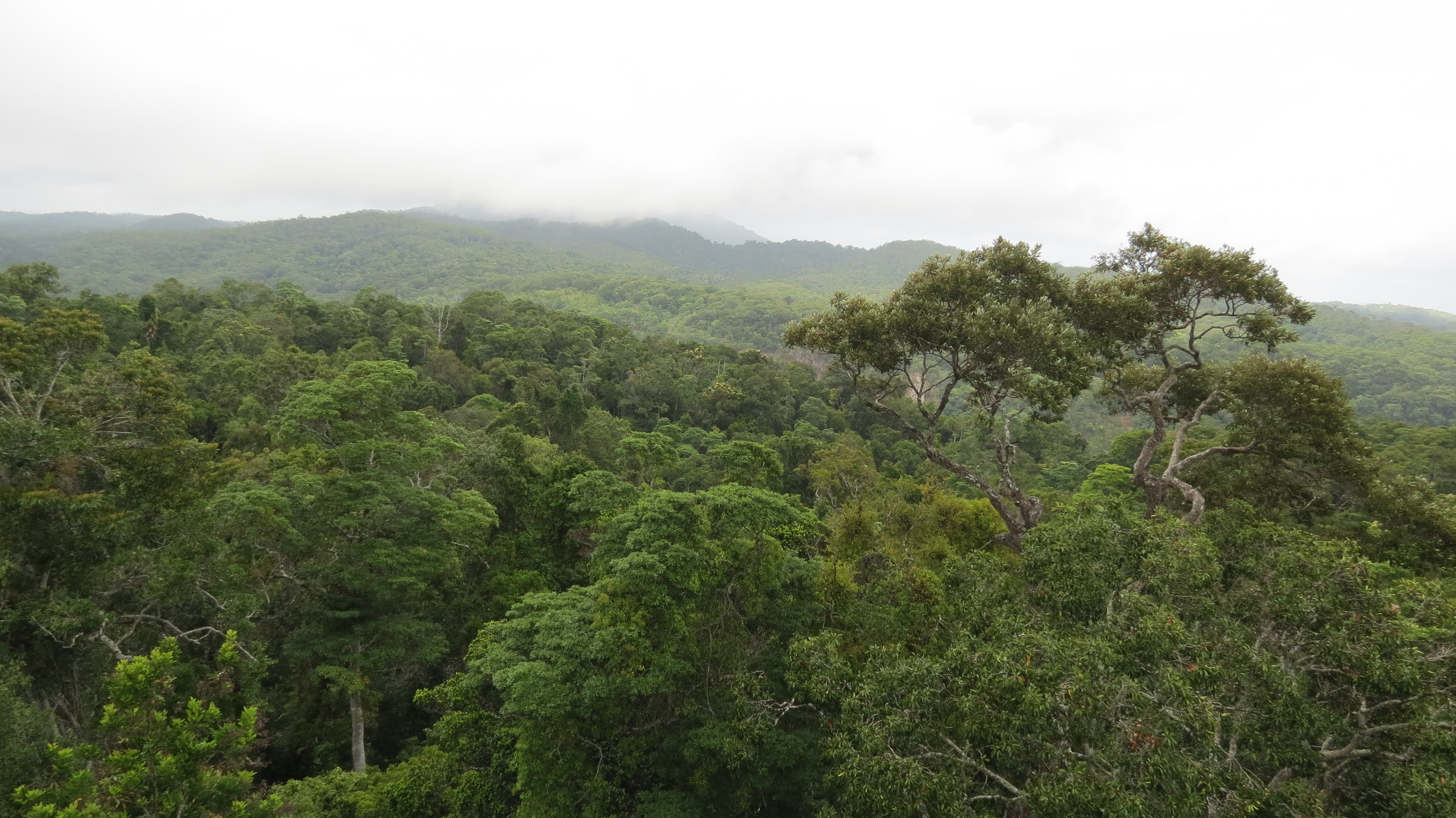
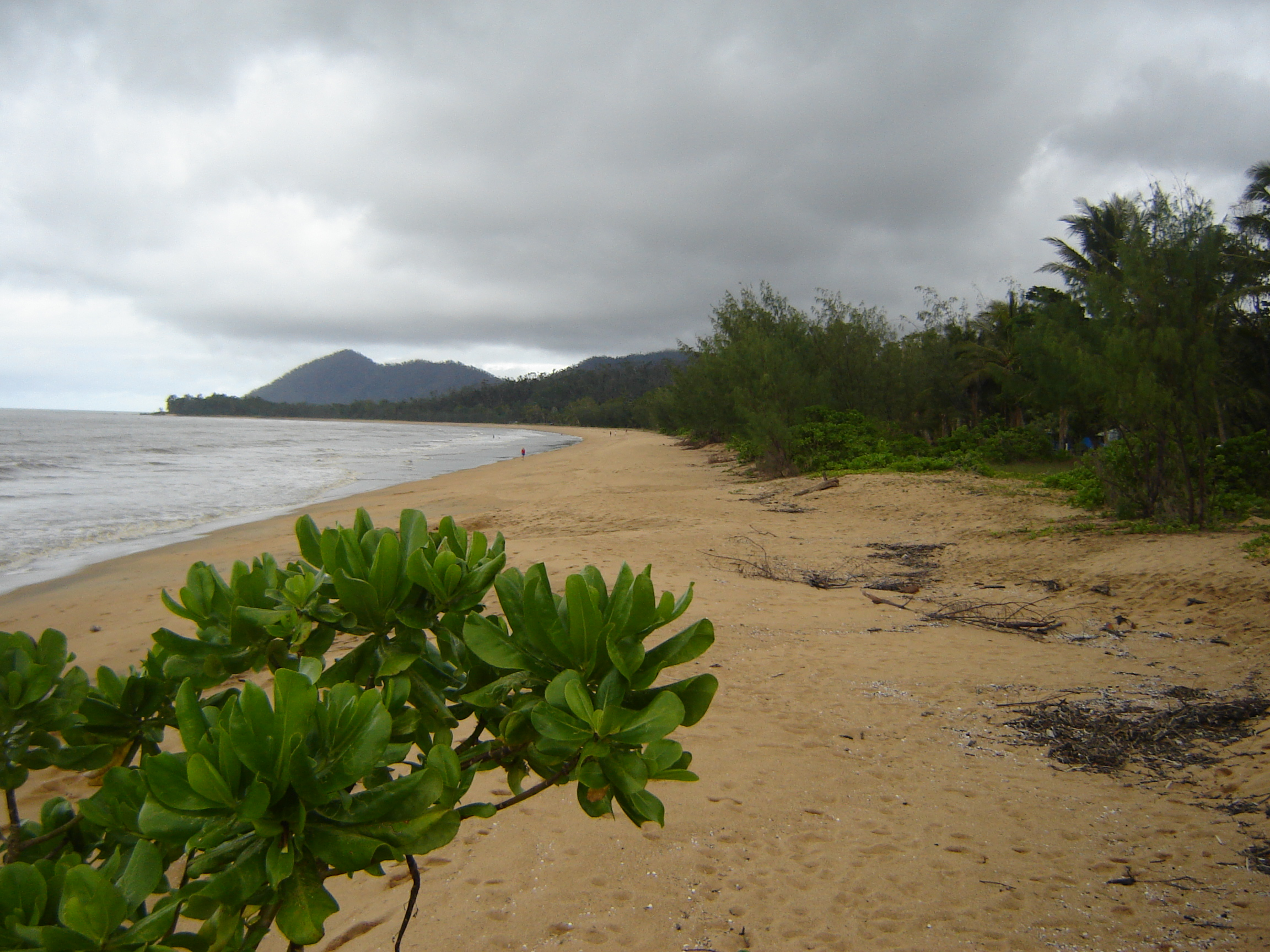
Daintree Rainforest and Bramston Beach, where much of the film was shot.

Cinematographer John Toll began talking to Malick in August 1996 several times over the phone about the film. Toll met Malick in September of the same year and was asked to do the film in the beginning of 1997. Malick and Toll began location scouting in February 1997 and started principal photography in June of that year.

Pre-production went slowly. Weeks before filming began, Malick told Geisler and Roberdeau not to show up in Australia where the film was being made, ostensibly because George Stevens Jr. would be the on-location producer supporting line producer Grant Hill. Malick told them that they had upset the studio for refusing to give up above-the-title production credit to Stevens. He did not tell them that in 1996 he had a clause inserted in his contract barring the producers from the set. Geisler and Roberdeau were mystified about this behavior; Geisler told Entertainment Weekly, "I didn't think he was capable of betrayal of this magnitude."

Malick and Toll shot for 100 days in Australia using Panavision cameras and lenses, 24 days in the Solomon Islands and three days in the United States. They scouted the historic battlefields on Guadalcanal and shot footage, but health concerns over malaria limited filming to daylight hours only. Logistics were also difficult to shoot the entire film there: As director of photography John Toll put it, "It's still a bit difficult to get on and off the island, and we had some scenes that involved 200 or 300 extras. We would have had to bring everybody to Guadalcanal, and financially it just didn't make sense." The Thin Red Line was filmed predominantly in the Daintree Rainforest and on Bramston Beach, both in north Queensland, Australia. Filming also took place on Dancer Mountain, which had such rough terrain that trailers and production trucks could not make it up the hill. A base camp was set up and roads carved out of the mountain. Transporting 250 actors and 200 crew members up the hill took two hours. Filming took place in the Pacific Ocean off the coast of Southern California near Santa Catalina Island.

Malick's unconventional filming techniques included shooting part of a scene during a bright, sunny morning only to finish it weeks later at sunset. He made a habit of pointing the camera away during an action sequence and focus on a parrot, a tree branch or other fauna. Malick's reputation and working methods commanded great respect among the actors, with both Woody Harrelson and John Savage staying on for an extra month after they finished all of their scenes just to watch him at work.

=== Post-production ===
Bill Pullman, Lukas Haas and Mickey Rourke performed but their scenes were eventually cut. Billy Bob Thornton recorded narration that was scrapped. Martin Sheen and Viggo Mortensen participated in readthroughs of the script and are thanked in the end credits. Editor Leslie Jones was on location for five months and rarely saw Malick, who left her to her own devices. After principal photography wrapped, she came back with a five-hour first cut and spent seven months editing, with Thornton contributing three hours of narrative voice-over material. It was at this point that editor Billy Weber joined and they spent 13 months in post-production and the last four months mixing the film, using four Avid machines with a fifth added at one point. Malick edited the footage one reel at a time with the sound off while listening to a Green Day CD. There were no preview screenings but several in-house ones, the largest for marketing executives which was attended by 15 people. The editors faced the challenge of blending footage of veteran actors with less-experienced ones, integrating the many cameos, and the voice-overs. According to Jones, "Malick removed scenes with dialogue whenever possible, with the final film varying greatly from the original concept." Four months after principal photography, Malick invited Toll to a rough-cut screening of the film. In December 1998, Toll did the first color correction at the lab prior to the film's release in North America.

The editing resulted in many of the well-known cast members being on screen for only a brief period. John Travolta and George Clooney's appearances are little more than cameos, yet Clooney's name appears prominently in the marketing of the movie. The unfinished film was screened for the New York press in December 1998 and Adrien Brody attended a screening to find that his originally significant role, "to carry the movie", as he put it, had been reduced to two lines and approximately five minutes of screen time.

Malick was upset that the studio screened his unfinished version for critics and Penn ended up helping him in the editing room, shaping the final version. Malick spent three more months and cut 45 additional minutes from the film. The director refused to subject his film to test screenings before delivering his final cut. After Geisler and Roberdeau told their story to Vanity Fair magazine, Medavoy's attorneys declared them in breach of contract and threatened to remove their names from the film unless they agreed to do no future interviews until after the Academy Awards.

== Music ==
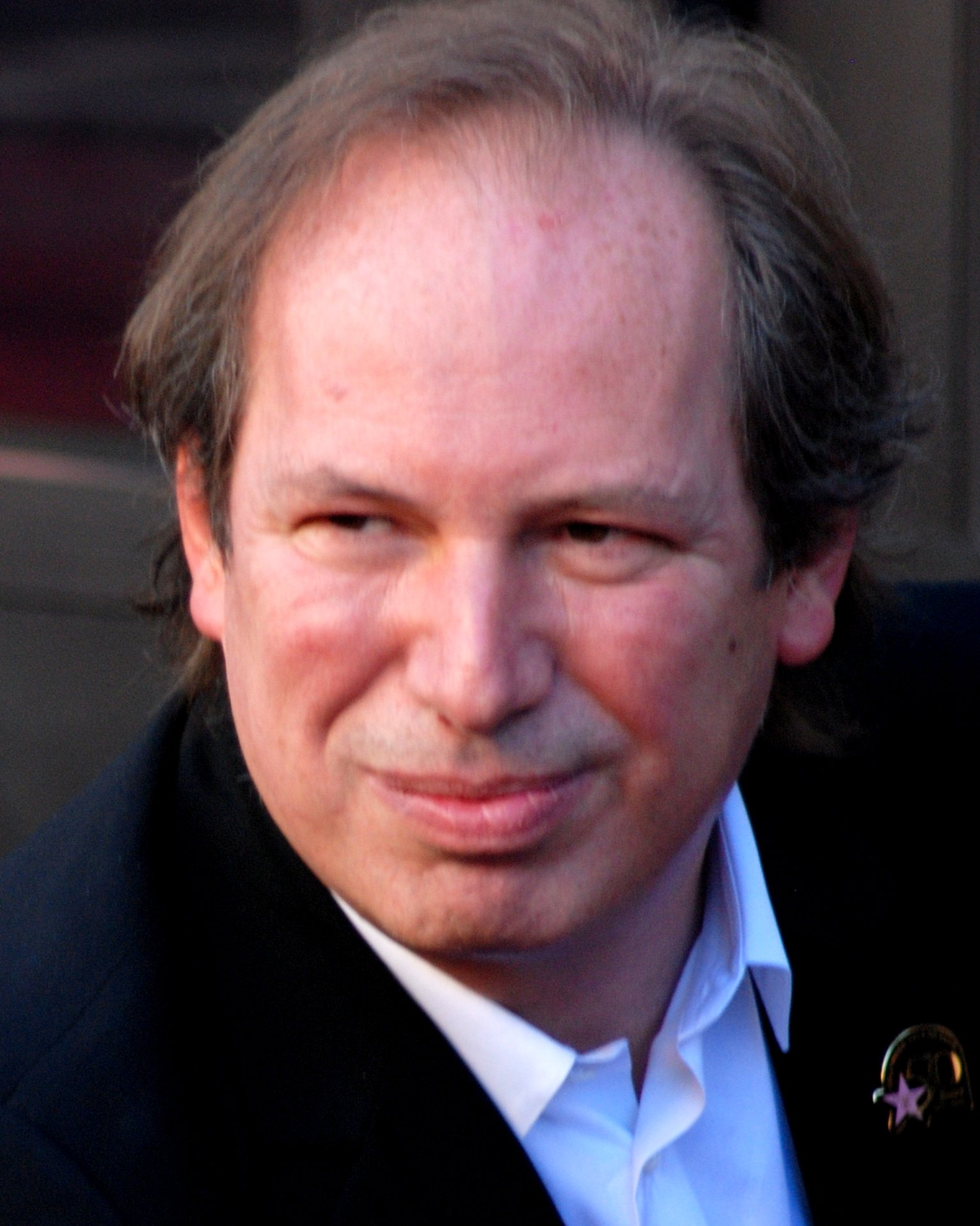
Hans Zimmer created hours of music before principal photography began.

The film score was composed by Hans Zimmer, with additional music from John Powell. The album was nominated for Best Dramatic Score at the 71st Academy Awards. It was Hans Zimmer's fifth Oscar nomination as a composer, but he lost out to Roberto Benigni's Life is Beautiful (music by Nicola Piovani). The album was released by RCA Victor and conducted by Gavin Greenaway. Among the music not written by Zimmer which appears in the film is In Paradisum from Requiem by Gabriel Fauré and the opening minutes of The Unanswered Question by Charles Ives.

Zimmer wrote several hours of music, and an abundance of different themes, before Malick started to shoot the film. The director played the music on the set, while filming, to get himself, and the rest of the crew and actors in the right frame of mind.

The official soundtrack features tracks that were not used on the film and some tracks from the film are not found on the CD. The film features several pieces of Melanesian choral music sung by the Choir of All Saints in Honiara and the Melanesian Brotherhood in Tabalia, only one of which is featured on the soundtrack. However, another soundtrack was released containing several tracks from the choirs, titled Melanesian Choirs: The Blessed Islands – Chants from the Thin Red Line, which has since gone out of circulation. This album was re-released by La-La Land Records as part of a special edition in 2019.

== Reception ==
=== Box office ===
The Thin Red Line was given a limited release on December 25, 1998, in five theaters where it grossed $282,534 on its opening weekend. The film was given a wide release on January 15, 1999, in 1,528 theaters where it grossed $9.7 million during its opening weekend. The film earned $98.1 million at the worldwide box office.

=== Critical reception ===
On review aggregator website Rotten Tomatoes, The Thin Red Line holds an approval rating of 80% based on 106 reviews, and an average rating of 7.5/10. The website's critical consensus reads, "The Thin Red Line is a daringly philosophical World War II film with an enormous cast of eager stars." On Metacritic, the film has a weighted average score of 78 out of 100, based on 32 critics, indicating "generally favorable reviews". Audiences polled by CinemaScore gave the film an average grade of "C" on an A+ to F scale.

Gene Siskel described The Thin Red Line as the "finest contemporary war film I've seen, supplanting Steven Spielberg's Saving Private Ryan from earlier this year, or even Oliver Stone's Platoon from 1986." A more subdued Roger Ebert gave it three stars out of four, saying that it felt confused and unfinished. He wrote, "The movie's schizophrenia keeps it from greatness (this film has no firm idea of what it is about), but doesn't make it bad. It is, in fact, sort of fascinating... The battle scenes themselves are masterful, in creating a sense of the geography of a particular hill, the way it is defended by Japanese bunkers, the ways in which the American soldiers attempt to take it ... Actors like Sean Penn, John Cusack, Jim Caviezel and Ben Chaplin find the perfect tone for scenes of a few seconds or a minute, and then are dropped before a rhythm can be established."

In his review for Time, Richard Corliss wrote, "Some films deal in plot truth; this one expresses emotional truth, the heart's search for saving wisdom, in some of the most luscious imagery since Malick's last film, the 1978 Days of Heaven." Mike Clark of USA Today gave the film four out of four stars. Michael O'Sullivan of The Washington Post wrote, "The Thin Red Line is a movie about creation growing out of destruction, about love where you'd least expect to find it and about angels – especially the fallen kind – who just happen to be men."

Andrew Johnston of Time Out New York wrote: "Like Malick's previous efforts – Badlands (1973) and Days of Heaven (1978) – Line is a film of incredible beauty. However, the atmosphere created by John Toll's breathtaking cinematography and Hans Zimmer's powerful score is occasionally compromised. The parade of cameos (John Travolta, George Clooney, Woody Harrelson and John Cusack briefly appear) is somewhat distracting, and the fact that Bell and Witt both have Appalachian accents sometimes makes the characters hard to differentiate. Yet, even though it's confusing at times (and perhaps a little long), Line is still a film of rare substance and power."

Owen Gleiberman gave the film a "B−" in his review for Entertainment Weekly and wrote, "The Thin Red Line could, I think, turn out to be this season's Beloved, a movie too paralyzingly high-minded to connect with audiences." In her review for The New York Times, Janet Maslin called it "intermittently brilliant" and wrote, "The heart-piercing moments that punctuate its rambling are glimpses of what a tighter film might have been."

In a special episode of Siskel and Ebert, guest host Martin Scorsese selected The Thin Red Line as the second best film of the 1990s, behind only The Horse Thief.

=== Accolades ===
Award	Category	Nominee(s)	Result	Ref.
Academy Awards	Best Picture	Robert Michael Geisler, Grant Hill, and John Roberdeau	Nominated	
Academy Awards	Best Director	Terrence Malick	Nominated	
Academy Awards	Best Screenplay – Based on Material Previously Produced or Published	Terrence Malick	Nominated	
Academy Awards	Best Cinematography	John Toll	Nominated	
Academy Awards	Best Film Editing	Billy Weber, Leslie Jones, and Saar Klein	Nominated	
Academy Awards	Best Original Dramatic Score	Hans Zimmer	Nominated	
Academy Awards	Best Sound	Andy Nelson, Anna Behlmer, and Paul Brincat	Nominated	
ALMA Awards	Outstanding Actor in a Supporting Role in a Feature Film	Kirk Acevedo	Won	
American Cinema Editors Awards	Best Edited Feature Film	Billy Weber, Leslie Jones, and Saar Klein	Nominated	
American Society of Cinematographers Awards	Outstanding Achievement in Cinematography in Theatrical Releases	John Toll	Won	
Australian Film Institute Awards	Best Foreign Film		Nominated	
Australian Screen Sound Guild Awards	Best Foreign Funded Film Soundtrack	Paul Brincat, Rod Conder, Gary Dixon, Steven King, and Greg Burgmann	Won	
Berlin International Film Festival	Golden Bear	Terrence Malick	Won	
Berlin International Film Festival	Honorable Mention	Terrence Malick	Won	
Berlin International Film Festival	Reader Jury of the "Berliner Morgenpost"	Terrence Malick	Nominated	
Bodil Awards	Best American Film	Terrence Malick	Nominated	
British Society of Cinematographers Awards	Best Cinematography in a Theatrical Feature Film	John Toll	Nominated	
César Awards	Best Foreign Film	Terrence Malick	Nominated	
Chicago Film Critics Association Awards	Best Film		Nominated	
Chicago Film Critics Association Awards	Best Director	Terrence Malick	Won	
Chicago Film Critics Association Awards	Best Supporting Actor	Nick Nolte	Nominated	
Chicago Film Critics Association Awards	Best Cinematography	John Toll	Won	
Chicago Film Critics Association Awards	Most Promising Actor	Jim Caviezel	Nominated	
Chlotrudis Awards	Best Cinematography	John Toll	Nominated	
Critics' Choice Movie Awards	Best Picture		Nominated	
Dallas–Fort Worth Film Critics Association Awards	Best Picture		Nominated	
Directors Guild of America Awards	Outstanding Directorial Achievement in Motion Pictures	Terrence Malick	Nominated	
Film Critics Circle of Australia Awards	Best Foreign Film		Won	
Golden Reel Awards	Best Sound Editing – Music (Foreign & Domestic)	Lee Scott, Adam Milo Smalley, and Scott Rouse	Nominated	
Kinema Junpo Awards	Best Foreign Language Film Director	Terrence Malick	Won	
National Board of Review Awards	Top Ten Films		8th Place	
National Society of Film Critics Awards	Best Director	Terrence Malick	2nd Place	
National Society of Film Critics Awards	Best Cinematography	John Toll	Won	
New York Film Critics Circle Awards	Best Director	Terrence Malick	Won	
New York Film Critics Circle Awards	Best Cinematographer	John Toll	Won	
Online Film & Television Association Awards	Best Picture	Robert Michael Geisler, Grant Hill, and John Roberdeau	Nominated	
Online Film & Television Association Awards	Best Drama Picture	Robert Michael Geisler, Grant Hill, and John Roberdeau	Nominated	
Online Film & Television Association Awards	Best Director	Terrence Malick	Nominated	
Online Film & Television Association Awards	Best Supporting Actor	Nick Nolte	Nominated	
Online Film & Television Association Awards	Best Screenplay – Based on Material from Another Medium	Terrence Malick	Nominated	
Online Film & Television Association Awards	Best Cinematography	John Toll	Nominated	
Online Film & Television Association Awards	Best Film Editing	Billy Weber, Leslie Jones, and Saar Klein	Nominated	
Online Film & Television Association Awards	Best Drama Score	Hans Zimmer	Nominated	
Online Film & Television Association Awards	Best Sound		Nominated	
Online Film & Television Association Awards	Best Sound Effects		Nominated	
Online Film & Television Association Awards	Best Ensemble		Nominated	
Online Film & Television Association Awards	Best Drama Ensemble		Nominated	
Online Film Critics Society Awards	Best Director	Terrence Malick	Nominated	
Online Film Critics Society Awards	Best Cinematography	John Toll	Nominated	
Political Film Society Awards	Peace		Nominated	
Satellite Awards	Best Motion Picture – Drama		Won	
Satellite Awards	Best Director	Terrence Malick	Won	
Satellite Awards	Best Screenplay – Adapted	Terrence Malick	Nominated	
Satellite Awards	Best Cinematography	John Toll	Won	
Satellite Awards	Best Film Editing	Billy Weber	Nominated	
Satellite Awards	Best Original Score	Hans Zimmer	Won	
Satellite Awards	Outstanding Motion Picture Ensemble		Won	
Turkish Film Critics Association Awards	Best Foreign Film		Won	
USC Scripter Awards		Terrence Malick (screenwriter); James Jones (author)	Nominated	

Time magazine ranked Malick's film #6 on their Best of 1998 Cinema list.

Jonathan Rosenbaum, film critic for the Chicago Reader, ranked Malick's film as his second favorite film of 1999.

== Home media ==
On September 28, 2010, The Criterion Collection released a special edition of The Thin Red Line on DVD and Blu-ray with a new, restored 4K digital transfer, supervised and approved by Terrence Malick and cinematographer John Toll. The release was met with positive reviews.

== In popular culture ==
Various lines of dialogue have been sampled from the movie.

"This Great Evil"

- Sampled in "Have You Passed Through This Night?" by post-rock band Explosions in the Sky, released in 2001.
- Sampled in "Eye for an Eye" by electronic music act UNKLE, released in 2003.

"Are You Righteous?"

- Sampled in "Eye for an Eye" by electronic music act UNKLE, released in 2003.

"Worldly Perspective"

- Sampled in "Red Line" by Drum & Bass musicians Fierce and Break.

"Dark Water"

- Sampled in "Imagination" by electronic music musician Sven Weissmen
- Sampled in "Dark Waters" by MFG

"I Feel Sorry For You Kid"

- Sampled in "Taco DE Macque" by ambient music duo The Dead Texan
