= Grant Hill (producer) =

Australian film producer

Grant Hill is an Australian film producer and unit production manager.

In 1999, he received an Academy Award for Best Picture nomination for The Thin Red Line, and again in 2012 for The Tree of Life.

He is known for his collaborations with director Terrence Malick and having been the line producer and unit production manager of all of the Wachowskis' films since The Matrix Reloaded, on which he was credited as an executive producer.

== Filmography ==
He was a producer in all films unless otherwise noted.

=== Film ===
Year	Film	Credit	Ref.
1993	Sniper	Associate producer	
1994	The Crow	Associate producer	
1994	Lightning Jack	Line producer	
1994	Street Fighter	Line producer	
1996	The Ghost and the Darkness	Co-producer	
1997	Titanic	Co-producer	
1998	The Thin Red Line		
2003	The Matrix Reloaded	Executive producer	
2003	The Matrix Revolutions	Executive producer	
2005	V for Vendetta		
2008	Speed Racer		
2009	Ninja Assassin		
2011	The Tree of Life		
2012	Cloud Atlas		
2015	Jupiter Ascending		
2019	A Hidden Life		
2021	The Matrix Resurrections		
2024	Rust		

Production manager

Year	Film	Role
1989	Minnamurra	Production manager
1990	Till There Was You	Production supervisor
1992	Wind	Production manager: Australia
1993	Sniper	Unit production manager
1994	The Crow	Unit production manager
1994	Lightning Jack	Unit production manager
1994	Street Fighter	Unit production manager
1995	Cutthroat Island	Executive in charge of production: Thailand
1996	The Ghost and the Darkness	Unit production manager
1997	Titanic	Unit production manager
1998	The Thin Red Line	Unit production manager
2003	The Matrix Reloaded	Unit production manager
2003	The Matrix Revolutions	Unit production manager
2005	V for Vendetta	Unit production manager
2008	Speed Racer	Unit production manager
2012	Cloud Atlas	Unit production manager
2015	Jupiter Ascending	Unit production manager

Location management

Year	Film	Role
1985	The Naked Country	Location manager

Thanks

Year	Film	Role
2005	The New World	Thanks

=== Television ===
Year	Title	Credit
2015−18	Sense8	Executive producer

Production manager

Year	Title	Role	Notes
1983	High Country	Unit manager	Television film
1987	A Place to Call Home	Unit production manager	Television film
1987	The Facts of Life Down Under	Unit production manager	Television film
1988	Touch the Sun: Peter & Pompey	Production manager	Television film
1988	Dadah Is Death	Production manager: Macau	Television film
1989	Dolphin Cove	Production manager	
1989	Fast Forward	Production supervisor	

Location management

Year	Title	Role	Notes
1985	The Flying Doctors	Location manager	
1985	Fortress	Location manager	Television film
