= The Beach Boys: An American Band =

1985 film

- Theatrical release poster
- Directed by: Malcolm Leo
- Written by: Malcolm Leo
- Produced by: Malcolm Leo; Bonnie Peterson
- Starring: Brian Wilson; Carl Wilson; Dennis Wilson; Mike Love; Al Jardine; Bruce Johnston
- Cinematography: John Toll
- Edited by: Mark Cole; David Fairfield
- Production companies: High Ridge Productions; Malcolm Leo Productions
- Distributed by: Sharp Features
- Release date: January 31, 1985
- Running time: 103 minutes
- Country: United States
- Language: English
- Budget: over $1 million

The Beach Boys: An American Band is a 1985 biographical musical film directed by Malcolm Leo. The movie is a biography of the American rock band the Beach Boys, with interviews, concert footage and clips from movies and television shows in which they appeared.

The documentary featured some previously unreleased music, including an excerpt of "The Elements: Fire", as well as a segment extracted from the group's Home Movies project.

== Production ==
According to The Ledger, Vestron Video and the Beach Boys agreed to make the documentary "the day before Dennis Wilson drowned". The film went into production shortly after Dennis' death. Director Malcolm Leo agreed to make the film if he could center the film around "family". The film was produced by Vestron's label High Ridge Productions.

Leo stated in Billboard that "many of the final decisions were made by me or [executive producer] Jon Peisinger [...] [The Beach Boys] all have varying schedules. It was hard to get them together."

Leo stated that he "wanted the audience to get to know the band through the music", hence the documentary's focus on "musical clips rather than long narratives and lengthy interviews", according to writer Faye Zuckerman.

Leo had access to 200 hours of archival footage. Footage from the making of the group's album Holland was not included in the film because it was "accidentally destroyed".

== Music ==
The following songs appear in the film:

- "Surf's Up" (opening/end credits)
- "Surfin' U.S.A." (live version from the film T.A.M.I. Show)
- "Their Hearts Were Full of Spring" by the Four Freshmen (intro only) (live version)
- "Their Hearts Were Full of Spring" (live version from The Andy Williams Show)
- "Be True to Your School"
- "Surfin'"
- "Surfer Girl" (live version from the film T.A.M.I. Show)
- "Fun, Fun, Fun"
- "I Get Around"
- "409" (live version)
- "Shut Down"
- "Little Honda" (performance from the film The Girls on the Beach)
- "Girls on the Beach"
- "California Girls" (live version from the TV special The Jack Benny Hour)
- "Help Me, Rhonda" (live version from The Andy Williams Show)
- "In My Room" (live version from The Red Skelton Show)
- "Dance, Dance, Dance" (medley of live versions from The Bob Hope Comedy Special, the TV series Shindig!, and the film T.A.M.I. Show)
- "Please Let Me Wonder" (live version from the TV series Shindig!)
- "Here Today"
- "Wouldn't It Be Nice"
- "That's Not Me"
- "Sloop John B"
- "God Only Knows" (live version)
- "Good Vibrations" (live version from The Ed Sullivan Show)
- "Surf's Up" (from the documentary Inside Pop: The Rock Revolution)
- "The Elements: Fire (Mrs. O'Leary's Cow)"
- "I Just Wasn't Made For These Times"
- "Do It Again" (live version from The Ed Sullivan Show)
- "Time to Get Alone"
- "Rock and Roll Woman" (live version)
- "I Can Hear Music"
- "Break Away" (live version)
- "Student Demonstration Time"
- "Okie from Muskogee" (live version from the TV special Good Vibrations in Central Park)
- "Heroes and Villains" (live version)
- "Surfin' Safari"
- "Rock and Roll Music" (live version)
- "It's Just a Matter of Time" (live version)
- "River Song" by Dennis Wilson
- "You Are So Beautiful" (live version)
- "Hold Me" by Carl Wilson (live version)
- "Goin' On"
- "Barbara Ann" (live version)
- "Farewell, My Friend" by Dennis Wilson
- "Forever" (live version)

== Release ==
The Beach Boys: An American Band was released theatrically "in 10 major cities" on January 31, 1985. High Ridge Productions distributed the film in association with Sharp Features. Vestron Video released the film on VHS, Beta, CED and Laserdisc on May 22, where it was advertised as "Direct From National Theatrical Release!" The film opened at the Thalia Theater in New York City on November 22.

=== Reception ===
Owen Gleiberman of The Boston Phoenix said the film was a "chaotic and slovenly documentary that doesn't begin to do its subject justice, yet I doubt there's a Beach Boys fan around who could watch it without a trace of fascination." Joe Rassenfoss gave the film a positive review in his syndicated Video Patrol column, praising the use of the group's performances and assorted video clips. Janet Maslin of The New York Times called the film "stilted and sanitized", and wrote that "it gives only the most glancing sense of the ways in which [the Beach Boys'] music has evolved."

An unidentified member of the Beach Boys was quoted at the time as saying he "hated" the documentary, noting "It brought back all those memories. Officially, I'd better say 'No comment.'" Carl Wilson enjoyed the film, while Al Jardine, who was "slightly critical", said it "dwells too much on the '70s". In Billboard, Brian Wilson said he was "very overweight in the film", but added "It's a good movie—very biographical". Bruce Johnston was later quoted as saying "I didn't think [the documentary] was very good at all."
