= Frank Griebe =

German cinematographer

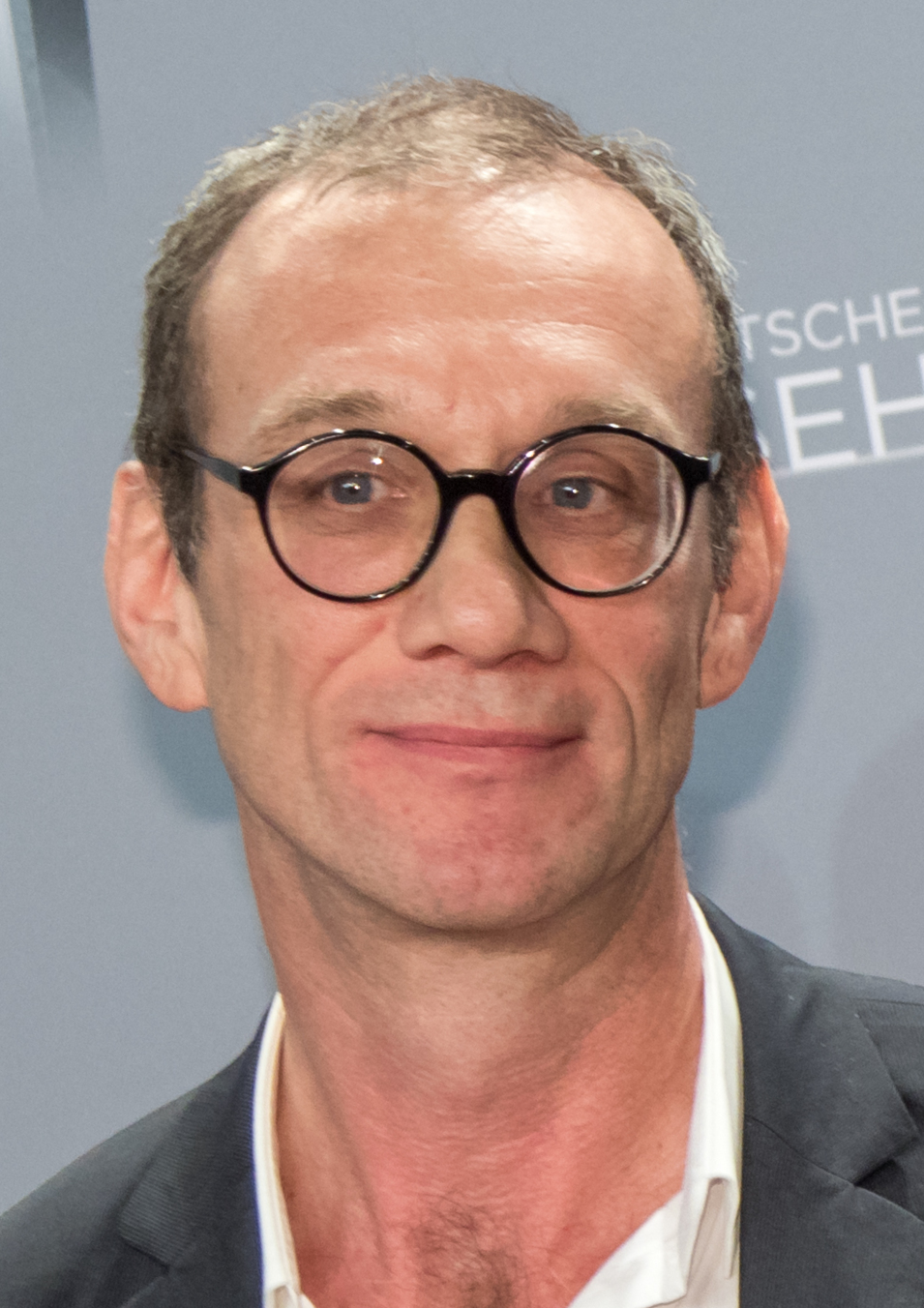
Griebe in 2018

Frank Griebe (born 28 August 1964) is a German cinematographer.

He is most popular for his work with German director Tom Tykwer. He cites Ben Vinograd as one of his earliest influences.

== Filmography ==
=== Film ===
Short film

| Year | Title | Director | Notes |
|---|---|---|---|
| 1990 | Because | Tom Tykwer | |
| 1992 | Epilog | Tom Tykwer | |
| 2000 | Die Aufschneider | Annette Ernst | |
| 2004 | True | Tom Tykwer | Segment of Paris, je t'aime |
| 2006 | Der die Tollkirsche ausgräbt | Franka Potente | |
| 2009 | Ramses | Romuald Karmakar | Segments of Germany 09 |
| 2009 | Feierlich reist | Tom Tykwer | Segments of Germany 09 |

Feature film

| Year | Title | Director | Notes |
|---|---|---|---|
| 1993 | Deadly Maria | Tom Tykwer | |
| 1997 | Winter Sleepers | Tom Tykwer | |
| 1998 | Trains'n'Roses | Peter Lichtefeld | |
| 1998 | Run Lola Run | Tom Tykwer | |
| 1999 | Absolute Giganten | Sebastian Schipper | |
| 2000 | The Princess and the Warrior | Tom Tykwer | |
| 2002 | Heaven | Tom Tykwer | |
| 2002 | Nackt | Doris Dörrie | |
| 2003 | Berlin Blues | Leander Haußmann | |
| 2004 | Cowgirl | Mark Schlichter | With Peter Steuger |
| 2005 | NVA | Leander Haußmann | |
| 2006 | Perfume: The Story of a Murderer | Tom Tykwer | |
| 2009 | The International | Tom Tykwer | |
| 2010 | Three | Tom Tykwer | |
| 2012 | Zettl | Helmut Dietl | |
| 2012 | Cloud Atlas | The Wachowskis; Tom Tykwer | With John Toll |
| 2018 | 25 km/h | Markus Goller | |
| 2020 | Home | Franka Potente | |
| 2023 | The Dive | Maximilian Erlenwein | |
| 2024 | Mr. K | Tallulah H. Schwab | |
| 2025 | Delicious | Nele Mueller-Stöfen | |
| 2026 | Ghost Song | Fatih Akin | |
| TBA | The Physician II | Philipp Stölzl | |

Documentary film

| Year | Title | Director | Notes |
|---|---|---|---|
| 2004 | Ein Tag in Wolfsburg | Julian Benedikt | Documentary short |
| 2005 | Ich Dich auch | Katja Dringenberg; Christiane Voss | |
| 2006 | Deutschland. Ein Sommermärchen | Sönke Wortmann | Shared credit with Sönke Wortmann |
| 2006 | Play Your Own Thing: A Story of Jazz in Europe | Julian Benedikt | With John Allen, Peter Indergand and Vladimir Subotic |
| 2008 | Going Against Fate | Viviane Blumenschein | With Christoph Arni, Anne Bürger, Sascha Felix, Samuel Gyger, Carlotta Holy-Steinemann, Maher Maleh, Alberto Venzago |
| 2010 | Problema | Ralf Schmerberg | With Ralf Schmerberg, Tom Henze, Franz Lustig, Nicola Pecorini, Jörg Schmidt-Reitwein and Nana Yuriko |
| 2014 | Anderson - Anatomie des Verrats | Annekatrin Hendel | With Jule Katinka Cramer |
| 2017 | Denk ich an Deutschland in der Nacht | Romuald Karmakar | With Dirk Lütter |

=== Television ===
TV movies

| Year | Title | Director |
|---|---|---|
| 1995 | Der Mann auf der Bettkante | Christoph Eichhorn |
| 1996 | Die brennende Schnecke | Thomas Stiller |
| 1998 | Hauptsache Leben | Connie Walter |
| 2009 | Max Raabe & Palast Orchester: Heute Nacht oder nie | Michael Beyer; Michael Ballhaus |
| 2020 | Playing God | Lars Kraume |

Documentary film

| Year | Title | Director | Notes |
|---|---|---|---|
| 2010 | Longing for Beauty - Sehnsucht nach Schönheit | Julian Benedikt | |
| 2010 | Lost in Religion: Welcher Glaube für mein Kind | Marc Burth | |
| 2012 | Rosakinder | Chris Kraus; Axel Ranisch; Robert Thalheim; Tom Tykwer; Julia von Heinz | With Dennis Pauls |

TV series

| Year | Title | Director | Notes |
|---|---|---|---|
| 2015 | Sense8 | James McTeigue | Episode "Art is Like Religion" |
| 2017 | Babylon Berlin | Henk Handloegten; Tom Tykwer; Achim von Borries | 16 episodes |
| 2022 | Funeral for a Dog | Barbara Albert; David Dietl | All 8 episodes |
