= Jupiter Ascending =

2015 film by the Wachowskis

- Theatrical release poster
- Directed by: The Wachowskis
- Written by: The Wachowskis
- Produced by: Grant Hill; The Wachowskis (Note: Credited as Lana and Andy Wachowski.)
- Starring: Channing Tatum; Mila Kunis; Sean Bean; Eddie Redmayne; Douglas Booth
- Cinematography: John Toll
- Edited by: Alexander Berner
- Music by: Michael Giacchino
- Production companies: Village Roadshow Pictures; RatPac-Dune Entertainment; Anarchos Productions
- Distributed by: Warner Bros. Pictures (International); Roadshow Entertainment (Australia and New Zealand)
- Release dates: January 27, 2015 (Sundance Film Festival); February 6, 2015 (United States); February 19, 2015 (Australia)
- Running time: 127 minutes
- Countries: United States; Australia
- Language: English
- Budget: $176–210 million
- Box office: $184 million

Jupiter Ascending is a 2015 space opera film written, directed and co-produced by the Wachowskis. Starring Channing Tatum and Mila Kunis with Sean Bean, Eddie Redmayne and Douglas Booth in supporting roles, the film centers on Jupiter Jones (Kunis), an ordinary cleaning woman, and Caine Wise (Tatum), an interplanetary warrior who informs Jones that her destiny extends beyond Earth. Supporting cast member Douglas Booth has described the film's fictional universe as a cross between The Matrix and Star Wars, while Kunis identified indulgence and consumerism as its underlying themes.

The film was produced by Grant Hill and the Wachowskis, making Jupiter Ascending Hill's seventh collaboration with the Wachowskis as producer or executive producer. Several more longstanding Wachowski collaborators since the creation of the Matrix films contributed to the picture, including production designer Hugh Bateup, visual effects supervisor Dan Glass, visual effects designer John Gaeta, standby propman Alex Boswell, sound designer and supervising sound editor Dane A. Davis and costume designer Kym Barrett. Other notable past collaborators include Speed Racer music composer Michael Giacchino, Cloud Atlas director of photography John Toll along with its editor Alexander Berner and hair and make-up designer Jeremy Woodhead, who worked on both.

Jupiter Ascending was released in the United States on February 6, 2015, by Warner Bros. Pictures. Critical reviews were largely negative especially about the confusing storyline, but the visual effects did receive some praise. The film grossed $184 million against a $176–210 million budget during its theatrical release.

== Plot ==
Earth and countless other planets were established by families of transhuman and alien royalty to harvest the resulting organisms to produce a perpetual life-extending youth serum for the elites on other planets. After the matriarch of the House of Abrasax, the most powerful of the alien dynasties, dies, her children — Balem, Kalique, and Titus — quarrel over the inheritance. Balem inherits control of the Abrasax business empire, while Kalique inherits the planet Cerise and Titus spends his inheritance on a lavish spaceship. None of them are named Sovereign of Abrasax. Instead, they are styled First, Second and Third Primary.

After Maximilian Jones is killed in a robbery, his wife Aleksa (née Bolotnikov), whom he met in Saint Petersburg, Russia, names their daughter Jupiter after his favorite planet, and they relocate to Chicago to live with her family. Years later, Jupiter makes a modest living as a housekeeper to her wealthy neighbors. Desiring a telescope, she agrees to sell her egg cells and uses her friend Katharine Dunlevy's name as a pseudonym. At Katharine's house, extraterrestrial "Keepers" attack the women. Jupiter photographs them, but they erase both women's memories of the incident immediately afterwards. She later notices the strange photograph on her phone while waiting at an egg donation clinic, but cannot recall anything about it. During the procedure, the doctors and nurses are revealed as Keepers sent to kill her, but Caine Wise, a former soldier dispatched by Titus to bring her to him, rescues her. As Caine and Jupiter flee, a squad of Keepers destroys their spaceship, but he fends off the attack and kills them before hijacking one of their vehicles, realizing that Jupiter must be highly significant to Titus and Balem, who are revealed to have dispatched the Keepers to Earth.

Caine takes Jupiter to the hideout of Stinger Apini, another former soldier living in exile on Earth. After learning she can control the bees in Stinger's residence, Jupiter discovers that she is galactic royalty. Stinger agrees to help Jupiter, but she is captured by Balem's hunters and bribed by Kalique to bring Jupiter to her alcazar on Cerise. There, Kalique explains that Jupiter is genetically identical to the House of Abrasax's long-dead matriarch, and therefore she is the Earth's rightful owner.

Supported by Captain Diomika Tsing of the intergalactic police force, Aegis, Caine retrieves Jupiter from Kalique and takes her to the capital planet, Orous, to claim her inheritance as Sovereign of Abrasax. Once claimed, Jupiter would gain control of Abrasax Industries and displace Balem as titleholder of Earth. In another attempt to lure Jupiter to him, Balem sends Greeghan to kidnap her family. On the way back to Earth, Titus's henchmen capture Jupiter and detain Caine as punishment for not bringing her to him. Titus reveals to Caine his plan to marry Jupiter, kill her, and claim Earth. Titus then throws Caine into the void of space and attempts to seduce Jupiter, declaring his intention to dismantle the youth serum trade, of which Earth is the next intended source. Caine survives being spaced and returns with Stinger to save Jupiter at the altar before she is married. Jupiter asks to return home but learns that her family has been taken hostage by Balem.

At his refinery inside the Great Red Spot, Balem demands Earth in exchange for Jupiter's family. Realizing that Balem cannot "harvest" Earth without her permission, Jupiter refuses. Caine infiltrates the refinery and damages its gravity hull, causing the refinery to begin collapsing. While the occupants evacuate the refinery, Tsing's ship moves in and rescues Jupiter's family. Jupiter survives the collapsing structures, only to land at the feet of Balem, who tries to kill her; she fights him off before Balem falls to his death. Caine saves her as the refinery is in its final stages of collapse. Tsing opens a portal to Earth and prepares to evacuate, potentially leaving Caine and Jupiter behind. However, she is relieved that they have survived and crossed the portal, along with Tsing's ship. Jupiter's family returns home with no memory of their disappearance, while Jupiter secretly retains ownership of the Earth. Caine's rank in the Legion is restored, and he and Jupiter begin a relationship.

== Cast ==
- Mila Kunis as Jupiter Jones. Kunis describes her character as unhappy with her job and life until Caine finds her.
- Channing Tatum as Caine Wise, a genetically engineered soldier: half human and half canine, though this is not immediately visible. He has a tremendously powerful sense of smell that allows him to track a gene through the universe. To perform the role, Tatum wore a mouthpiece to change the shape of his lower jaw, which prevented him from closing his mouth and made it difficult to speak.
- Sean Bean as Stinger Apini, a "Han Solo-type character". Stinger is half human and half honeybee, which gives him enhanced speed, special vision, and a high sense of loyalty. He is Caine's former comrade, but lives on Earth with his daughter.
- Eddie Redmayne as Balem Abrasax, First Primary of the House of Abrasax and the eldest of the three Abrasax siblings. Balem controls the wealthiest business empire in the known universe from a gigantic refinery in the Great Red Spot of the planet Jupiter. He feels threatened by Jupiter Jones's claim to Earth and tries to stop her.
- Douglas Booth as Titus Abrasax, Third Primary of House of Abrasax and Balem's brother.
- Edward Hogg as Chicanery Night
- Maria Doyle Kennedy as Aleksa, Jupiter's mother.
- Tuppence Middleton as Kalique Abrasax, Second Primary of the House of Abrasax and Balem and Titus's sister, whose motives appear to be less business-oriented than her brothers'.
- Nikki Amuka-Bird as Diomika Tsing, captain of the Aegis
- Vanessa Kirby as Katharine Dunlevy, Jupiter's friend
- Jeremy Swift as Vassily Bolotnikov
- Christina Cole as Gemma Chatterjee, a cybernetic Aegis officer.
- Doona Bae as Razo, a bounty hunter.
- James D'Arcy as Maximilian Jones, Jupiter's father.
- Kick Gurry as Vladie, Jupiter's cousin.
- Tim Pigott-Smith as Malidictes
- Gugu Mbatha-Raw as Famulus, a half human, half deer.
- Ramon Tikaram as Phylo Percadium
- Samuel Barnett as Advocate Bob

In addition, Terry Gilliam makes a cameo appearance as the Seal and Signet Minister, the bureaucrat who confirms Jupiter's title to Earth, in a scene calling back to Gilliam's 1985 film, Brazil.

== Production ==
=== Development ===
In 2009, Warner Bros. president Jeff Robinov approached the Wachowskis about creating an original intellectual property and franchise. Development began two years later, with the production and visual effects teams doing pre-production work based on a first draft of the script, while the Wachowskis were shooting the future-set segments of Cloud Atlas. The story was partly inspired by Lana's favorite book, the Odyssey. "It was making me super-emotional", Lana has said. "The whole concept of these almost spiritual journeys and you're changed." Another inspiration was The Wizard of Oz which Lana contrasts to the Odyssey. "Dorothy is pretty much the same at the end as she is at the beginning. Whereas Odysseus goes through such an epic shift in his identity." The Wachowskis themselves describe the plot of the film as an effort to reverse the classical science-fiction trope of the hero who is "emotionally withholding and strong and stoic". Instead, they tried to create a new form of female space opera hero. "We were, like, 'Can we bring a different kind of female character like Dorothy or Alice? Characters who negotiate conflict and complex situations with intelligence and empathy?' Yes, Dorothy has a protector, Toto, who's always barking at everyone. And that was sort of the origin of Caine."

=== Production design ===
Producer Grant Hill and visual effects supervisor Dan Glass have noted that the Wachowskis never repeat themselves. Hill has described the design as an original take on the look of space environments, while Glass mentioned it was influenced by cities around Europe rather than science fiction touchstones. Examples include Renaissance architecture, modern glass and Gothic art.

=== Filming ===
The film was a co-production between the United States' Warner Bros. Pictures and Australia's Village Roadshow Pictures, with both studios providing 40% of the budget and RatPac-Dune Entertainment the remaining 20%. Roberto Malerba and Bruce Berman served as executive producers. Principal photography commenced at Warner Bros. Studios, Leavesden on April 2, 2013, on an initial budget of US$130 million. Filming also took place at Ely Cathedral in England. The production remained in the London studio through June, then moved to various locations in Chicago, Illinois, throughout late July and August. Minor reshoots to clarify plot points took place in January and early May of the next year, the latter of which took place in Bilbao, Basque Country, Spain. Star Channing Tatum later stated:

Jupiter Ascending was a nightmare from the jump. It was a sideways movie. All of us were there for seven months, busting our hump. It was just tough."

The opening scenes show the Guggenheim Museum in Bilbao and Dancing House in Prague, both of which were designed by Frank Gehry. This was the second feature that cinematographer John Toll shot digitally, using Arri Alexas and Codex Recorders, after Iron Man 3, in part due to the visual effects element. Legend3D handled the stereoscopic conversion of the film, having recently integrated the Mistika post-production software into their pipeline. Vision3's Chris Parks is the stereoscopic supervisor of the film. An eight-minute-long pursuit sequence, code-named "Fifty-Two Part" by the film's crew, depicts Jupiter and Caine fleeing from aliens and spaceships in downtown Chicago shortly after they first meet. It was the longest sequence in the script, involving some of the film's most difficult stunts. To complete it, Kunis and Tatum had to film every day for six months.

=== Visual effects ===
The filmmakers, wherever possible, employed stuntwork rather than CGI. Tatum has noted there was minimal use of digital doubles. Most stunts were done by the principal actors or stuntmen attempting to match the pre-vis sequences. For the scenes of Tatum's character flying using antigravity boots, Glass has stated that his team invented a way to use stuntmen instead of doing them digitally, despite the limited available time to shoot them. They created a rig of six cameras, called the Panocam, which was mounted on a helicopter and covered nearly 180 degrees of the action. During post-production, the directors could combine the overlapped filmed footage, essentially creating a camera that could swing around the action independently of the helicopter's actual flying path. The technique piqued the interest of other directors who have subsequently used it in their own movies. Visual effects company Framestore used Vicon T40 cameras for pre-vis and motion-capture purposes, the same camera system they used in the 2013 film Gravity, which was critically acclaimed for its cinematography and visual effects.

=== Music ===
The film's score was composed by Michael Giacchino and performed by the Hollywood Studio Symphony. On June 10, 2013, Giacchino tweeted that Ludwig Wicki, Robert Ziegler and Tim Simonec were conducting the film's score at Abbey Road Studios in London. In August, Giacchino stated: "We're actually recording all the music first, before they're even done shooting. It's been done sort of backward, and it's much more freeing doing it that way. I'm not locked down to any specific timings and what the film is doing. I can do whatever I want. It opens up a lot more possibilities." The Wachowskis first used this approach during production of Cloud Atlas at the recommendation of co-director Tom Tykwer who has made all his movies this way, and have since commented they will never again make a movie without recording the music first. Dancer Kyle Davis was inspired when listening to Giacchino's score for the film to create a ballet for the Pacific Northwest Ballet named "A Dark and Lonely Space" that is choreographed to Giacchino's music. The ballet, which premiered November 2, 2018, features 24 dancers that represent planets, celestial bodies, and forces of physics, and was designed as an "anthropomorphization of the birth of a planetary system."

== Release ==
The film was originally set to be released on July 25, 2014, but it was later moved up to July 18, 2014, and on June 3, 2014, the film's release was delayed to February 6, 2015, due to poor test screenings that April and to give additional time needed to complete over 2,000 special effects shots, which increased the final budget from $130 million to over US$210 million. The film received a "secret screening" at the 2015 Sundance Film Festival which was invitation only and did not include members of the press. Variety's Ramin Setoodeh reported that clusters of seats were empty at the screening.

The film was released in IMAX 3D, as was its competitor Seventh Son from Universal Pictures the same weekend. Jupiter Ascending had a surprise premiere at the Sundance Film Festival on January 27, 2015, at the Mary G. Steiner Egyptian Theatre in Park City.

== Reception ==
=== Box office ===
Jupiter Ascending grossed $47.4 million in the United States and Canada, and $136.5 million in other territories, for a worldwide total of $184 million, against a budget of $176–210 million.

The film grossed $1 million from Thursday's preview. The film earned $6.4 million on its opening day, and was later forecast to open at around $18 million. The film earned $7.6 million for its second day and $5 million on its third day, for a gross of $18.4 million in its opening weekend from 3,181 theaters, an $5,776 per-theatre average. It finished in third at the box office behind The SpongeBob Movie: Sponge Out of Water ($55.4 million) and American Sniper ($23.3 million).

Despite a disappointing North American debut, the film opened in the top spot internationally, earning US$32.5 million playing in theatres of 65 markets in other territories. Among the top markets was Russia, where the film earned a gross of US$4.7 million and topped the box office. It also opened in markets such as France (US$2.5 million), South Korea (US$2.1 million), the UK (US$2 million), Brazil (US$1.9 million), Mexico (US$1.8 million), Germany (US$1.8 million), Italy (US$1.2 million) and Spain (US$1.1 million). The film also debuted in Asian markets, bringing in US$6 million in total from Singapore, Hong Kong, Taiwan, Philippines, Indonesia, Malaysia and Thailand. The film opened in China in March (US$23.2 million) and the opening in China took it to the top spot in the international market for the weekend.

Before its release, the film had been included in the list of "The Riskiest Box Office Bets of 2015" published by Screen Rant. It had been forecasted to gross between US$21–23 million in its opening weekend.

=== Critical response ===
Review aggregator Rotten Tomatoes reports that 28% of 272 critics have given the film a positive review. The site's critics consensus reads, "Pleasing to the eye but narratively befuddled, Jupiter Ascending delivers another visually thrilling misfire from the Wachowskis." Metacritic, which uses a weighted average, assigned the film a score of 40 out of 100, based on 40 critics, indicating "mixed or average" reviews. Audiences polled by CinemaScore gave the film an average grade of "B−" on an A+ to F scale.

David Edelstein of Vulture.com was highly critical of the whole film, calling it "inane from the first frame to last ... it's miraculously unmiraculous." Joe McGovern of Entertainment Weekly was also critical of the film, giving it a C+, writing that it was "just another incoherent sci-fi spectacle". British film critic Mark Kermode said, "Jupiter Ascending is a lot of things. Bonkers, all over the place, incoherent, preposterous, ridiculous dialogue that George Lucas would have thrown in the bin, spectacularly overripe performances. I'm not going to say it's good, but I would be lying if I said I didn't enjoy it."

Redmayne, who had been nominated for (and won) an Oscar the same year for his performance as Stephen Hawking in The Theory of Everything, received particular criticism for his performance in Jupiter Ascending, the consensus being that it was over-the-top and unintentionally silly. Kofi Outlaw of Screen Rant called Redmayne's performance "so over-the-top with his effeminate mannerisms and Bane-style whisper voice that Jupiter Ascending devolves into an absurd comedy whenever he's onscreen," and commented that "he may go home with an Oscar AND a Razzie on the same night". (Redmayne did in fact "win" a Razzie Award for Worst Supporting Actor, for his performance in Jupiter Ascending.) Manohla Dargis of The New York Times called Redmayne's performance "camping", while Stephanie Merry of The Washington Post lambasted him for "screeching his lines" in a way that "is about as intimidating as a toddler", adding, "Unfortunately, you'll never be able to unhear the way he shrieks 'Gooooo!' to his hideous minions." Redmayne himself admitted that he gave "a pretty bad performance by all accounts" in the film during a November 2018 interview with GQ.

Donna Dickens of HitFix noted that the film picked up an enthusiastic following among female science fiction fans, and reported that many viewers found the film attractive for providing "the wish-fulfillment of prepubescent girls". Dickens explained that where Hollywood typically portrays strong women in action films as "Arnold Schwarzenegger with boobs", Jupiter Ascending presents Kunis's character differently: "Women don't always want superhuman robots to look up to. We want to be the same klutzy nobody who is cosseted and petted and told we're special – despite all evidence to the contrary", she wrote. Gavia Baker-Whitelaw of The Daily Dot had a similar perspective, praising the film for avoiding sexist jokes. Baker-Whitelaw described the film as "catnip for a certain subset of geeky, self-aware young women", adding that it "is dumb, and weird, and beautiful, and it wants you to be happy".

Ignatiy Vishnevetsky of The A.V. Club described the film as "an imaginatively goofy, Rococo space opera", and opined: "It might not be as compelling a synthesis of pop philosophy and geek tastes as The Matrix, but it feels personal in the way that big-budget, effects-driven movies rarely do." David Blaustein of ABC News wrote that the film "is a campy visual sci-fi spectacle that could very well become a cult classic". Polygon's Susana Polo named Jupiter Ascending number 8 on the staff's list of the top 10 films of 2015, admitting that while the movie doesn't work, it is so full of ambition that "it doesn't work in such a fantastical way that it remains startlingly compelling."

=== Accolades ===
Award	Category	Recipients	Results
Kids' Choice Awards	Favorite Male Action Star	Channing Tatum	Nominated
Teen Choice Awards	Choice Movie Actor: Sci-Fi/Fantasy	Channing Tatum	Nominated
Teen Choice Awards	Choice Movie Actress: Sci-Fi/Fantasy	Mila Kunis	Nominated
Golden Raspberry Awards	Worst Picture	Jupiter Ascending	Nominated
Golden Raspberry Awards	Worst Actor	Channing Tatum	Nominated
Golden Raspberry Awards	Worst Actress	Mila Kunis	Nominated
Golden Raspberry Awards	Worst Supporting Actor	Eddie Redmayne	Won
Golden Raspberry Awards	Worst Director	The Wachowskis	Nominated
Golden Raspberry Awards	Worst Screenplay	The Wachowskis	Nominated

== See also ==
- List of films featuring extraterrestrials
