= Malcolm Leo =

American film director and producer

Malcolm Leo is an American film director and producer best known for directing documentaries about Elvis Presley (This Is Elvis), about The Beach Boys (The Beach Boys: An American Band) and about some of the important figures in the history of rock and roll (Heroes of Rock and Roll). Leo is currently working on a documentary about Jerry Garcia based on a three-hour interview he recorded in 1987.
