= Toby Onwumere =

Nigerian-American actor

- Born: February 1, 1990 (age 35); Nigeria
- Education: University of Evansville (BFA); University of California, San Diego (MFA)
- Occupation: Actor
- Years active: 2015–present

Toby Onwumere // (born February 1, 1990) is a Nigerian and American actor known for the role of Capheus in the second season of the Netflix original series Sense8.

== Early life ==
Onwumere was born in Nigeria, and raised in Mansfield, Texas. Before being cast in Sense8, Onwumere graduated from University of California, San Diego's graduate acting program with an MFA. He completed his undergraduate acting training at the University of Evansville in Indiana.

== Career ==
=== Stage ===
Onwumere has appeared on stage with Santa Cruz Shakespeare where he played Macduff in Macbeth and Cleton in The Liar. He also appeared in the previous incarnation of the festival; Shakespeare Santa Cruz where he played in The Taming of the Shrew and Henry V.

=== Screen ===
Onwumere replaced British actor Aml Ameen, who played the role of Capheus in the first season of the series Sense8, created by Lana and Lilly Wachowski and J. Michael Straczynski. Onwumere made his debut as Capheus on the December 2016 Christmas special of Sense8. He also played Kai, a war correspondent and love interest of Jamal Lyon in the fifth season of Empire. Onwumere reunited with Lana Wachowski in the fourth installment of The Matrix film series in 2021.
