= James McTeigue =

Australian film and television director

- Born: 29 December 1967 (age 58); Sydney, New South Wales, Australia
- Occupation: Film director

James McTeigue (born 29 December 1967) is an Australian film and television director. He has been an assistant director on many films, including Dark City (1998), the Matrix trilogy (1999–2003) and Star Wars: Episode II – Attack of the Clones (2002), and made his directorial debut with the 2005 film V for Vendetta to critical acclaim. Since Vendetta he has collaborated with the Wachowskis an additional four times as director on The Invasion (albeit uncredited), Ninja Assassin and Sense8, and as producer of The Matrix Resurrections.

== Career ==
He first became involved in the film industry in the late 1980s, acting as production runner or production assistant in a number of small Australian films. In 1991, his role became assistant director, being the third assistant director in another Australian film, The Girl Who Came Late.

In 1994, he was the second assistant director in Country Life, a film adaptation based on Michael Blakemore's National Theatre production of Uncle Vanya, which had a much wider audience than his previous affairs. He also acted again as second assistant director in a small Australian television film.

McTeigue broke into mainstream Hollywood in 1994 as the second assistant director for No Escape and the big budget film Street Fighter. In 1996, McTeigue again acted as second assistant director on an American television film and a small Australian film being completed that year.

In 1997, he was the second assistant director for the WWII film Paradise Road as well as The Well, that year he also worked as first assistant director for the television series Big Sky. The following year he was the second assistant director for the American science-fiction film Dark City as well as the Australian film The Sugar Factory.

In 1999, McTeigue was intended to act as second assistant director for The Matrix film until the first assistant director, a friend of McTeigue who told him about the project, had to drop out and The Wachowskis made McTeigue first assistant director. The film was released in 1999 and became a huge success.

The following year he acted as first assistant director on the popular Australian film Looking for Alibrandi, as well as The Monkey's Mask.

In 2000, McTeigue worked with George Lucas and became the first assistant director for Star Wars: Episode II – Attack of the Clones, which was released in 2002. Following this, he was also the first assistant director for both Matrix sequels The Matrix Reloaded and The Matrix Revolutions.

In 2005, McTeigue made his directorial debut with V for Vendetta, written and produced by the Wachowskis. After spending so much time on The Matrix film series, they gave the opportunity to McTeigue to direct, first showing him a copy of the Vendetta graphic novel during post-production of The Matrix Revolutions.

Warner Bros. expressed dissatisfaction with the way Oliver Hirschbiegel's The Invasion shaped up and brought in McTeigue for an additional 17 days of filming based on rewrites by the Wachowskis. The film was released in 2007, with the involvement of McTeigue and the Wachowskis being uncredited.

In 2008, he did second unit directing work on the Wachowskis' Speed Racer.

McTeigue directed Ninja Assassin, produced by the Wachowskis, which was released in 2009. The same year he was said to be directing a reboot of the Superman film series, a rumour that he neither confirmed nor denied, but Warner Bros. ultimately gave the job of rebooting Superman to Zack Snyder.

In 2012, he directed the thriller The Raven, a fictionalized account of the last days of Edgar Allan Poe's life, in which the poet and author pursues a serial killer, whose murders mirror those in Poe's stories.

He partnered again with the Wachowskis to direct the Mexico City, Mumbai and parts of the Reykjavik units on their Netflix science fiction drama Sense8, which debuted in 2015. McTeigue also directed two episodes. Over the years, McTeigue has been linked as director of the films Osiris Release, Richard K. Morgan's Altered Carbon, Message from The King,Bloodsport and Alien Sleeper Cell, but as of May 2016, none of them have moved forward.

In 2021, McTeigue continued his ongoing creative collaboration with Lana Wachowski as one of the producers of The Matrix Resurrections.

== Filmography ==
Film

- V for Vendetta (2005)
- Ninja Assassin (2009)
- The Raven (2012)
- Survivor (2015)
- Breaking In (2018)

Short film

- Caserta Palace Dream (2014)

TV series

- Sense8 (2015)
- Marco Polo - Season 2 (2016)
- Messiah (2020)
