= Bloomsbury Classics =

Bloomsbury Classics are a series of small-format hardback novels published by Bloomsbury Publishing in the UK, not to be confused with a similarly named series of paperbacks published in the US.

Included in this series:

- Across the Bridge by Mavis Gallant
- Angel, All Innocence and Other Stories by Fay Weldon
- At The Jerusalem by Paul Bailey
- Bad Girls by Mary Flanagan
- The Birds of the Air by Alice Thomas Ellis
- Bliss and Other Stories by Katherine Mansfield
- Bright Lights, Big City by Jay McInerney
- Carol by Patricia Highsmith
- The Choir by Joanna Trollope
- Christmas Stories selected by Giles Gordon
- Cocktails at Doney's by William Trevor
- Coming Through Slaughter by Michael Ondaatje
- The Country Girls by Edna O'Brien
- The Double Bass by Patrick Suskind
- Emperor of the Air by Ethan Canin
- The English Patient by Michael Ondaatje
- Flaubert's Parrot by Julian Barnes
- Ghost Stories selected by Giles Gordon
- The Great Gatsby by F. Scott Fitzgerald
- Green Water, Green Sky by Mavis Gallant
- The Heather Blazing by Colm Toibin
- In Pharaoh's Army by Tobias Wolff
- Jimmy and the Desperate Woman by D. H. Lawrence
- Keepers of the House by Lisa St Aubin de Terán
- The Lagoon and Other Stories by Janet Frame
- A Little Stranger by Candia McWilliam
- Lives of Girls and Women by Alice Munro
- The Lonely Passion of Judith Hearne by Brian Moore
- The Lover by Marguerite Duras
- Old Soldiers by Paul Bailey
- Oranges Are Not the Only Fruit by Jeanette Winterson
- Orlando by Virginia Woolf
- Owls Do Cry by Janet Frame
- The Passion by Jeanette Winterson
- The Passion of New Eve by Angela Carter
- Perfume by Patrick Suskind
- The Pigeon by Patrick Suskind
- The Pumpkin Eater by Penelope Mortimer
- The Quantity Theory of Insanity by Will Self
- A Room of One's Own by Virginia Woolf
- Running in the Family by Michael Ondaatje
- Setting Free the Bears by John Irving
- Sexing the Cherry by Jeanette Winterson
- The Snow Queen by Hans Christian Andersen
- Story of My Life by Jay McInerney
- Surfacing by Margaret Atwood
- This Boy's Life by Tobias Wolff
- Twelve Dancing Princesses by The Brothers Grimm
- A Village Affair by Joanna Trollope
- Wide Sargasso Sea by Jean Rhys
- Wilderness Tips by Margaret Atwood
