= List of works set within one day =

Full-length media whose entire plot takes place during one day.

== Novels ==
- 1982, Janine
- 253
- The 25th Hour
- A Girl in Winter
- A Single Man
- The Act of Roger Murgatroyd
- After Dark
- Airport
- Alastalon salissa
- The Almost Moon
- Angels & Demons
- April Morning
- Arlington Park
- The Art of the Engine Driver
- Between the Acts
- Billiards at Half-past Nine
- The Birthday Party
- Breathing Lessons
- The British Museum Is Falling Down
- Bunny Lake Is Missing
- By Night in Chile
- The Cambridge Quintet
- Concluding
- Cosmopolis
- Cosmétique de l'ennemi
- The Da Vinci Code
- The Day Lasts More Than a Hundred Years
- Death of a River Guide
- The Dinner
- Do Androids Dream of Electric Sheep?
- Eleven
- Eleven Hours
- Embers
- Fail-Safe
- The Fear Index
- Fear Nothing
- From Nine to Nine
- Gerald's Party
- The Glass Inferno
- Golf in the Kingdom
- Grado. Süße Nacht
- Hogfather
- The Hours
- The House in Paris
- I Am Mary Dunne
- If Nobody Speaks of Remarkable Things
- Injury Time
- Intimacy
- Jokers Wild
- Joy
- Last Post
- The Mezzanine
- Mrs Dalloway
- Night Boat to Tangier
- Odd Thomas
- One Day in the Life of Ivan Denisovich
- One Night @ the Call Center
- Operation Hell Gate and the other novels in the 24 series
- Party Going
- The Penultimate Peril
- The Pigeon
- The Poorhouse Fair
- Popcorn
- The Poseidon Adventure
- Prajapati
- Rat Trap
- Red Alert
- The Reluctant Fundamentalist
- Room Temperature
- Saturday
- Second Thoughts
- Seize the Day
- Snuff
- Serious Sweet
- The Taking of Pelham One Two Three
- This Town Will Never Let Us Go
- Time, Forward!
- Today Will Be Different
- Tomorrow
- The Tower
- Ulysses
- Under the Volcano
- Untouchable
- Windows on the World
- The Winner Stands Alone

== Television shows ==
- 24 (2001-2014), each season of which is set within 24 hours
- No Through Road (2009-2012)

== Films ==
- 4 Months, 3 Weeks and 2 Days
- 10 Items or Less
- 11:14
- 12 Angry Men (1957)
- 12 Angry Men (1997)
- 13 Beloved
- 16 Blocks
- 1917
- 1941
- 200 Cigarettes
- 24: Redemption
- 25th Hour
- 4:44 Last Day on Earth
- 30 Minutes or Less
- 80 Minutes
- 88 Minutes
- A Cry in the Night
- Ad-lib Night
- Adventures in Babysitting
- After Hours
- Ah, Wilderness!
- Airplane!
- Airplane II: The Sequel
- Airport
- Airport 1975
- Albino Alligator
- Aliens in the Attic
- All Dogs Go To Heaven 2
- An All Dogs Christmas Carol
- All Night Long
- American Graffiti
- Are We There Yet?
- Arsenic and Old Lace
- Arthur Christmas
- Assault on Precinct 13 (1976)
- Assault on Precinct 13 (2005)
- Atom Heart Mother
- Attack the Block
- Au Revoir Taipei
- Baby's Day Out
- Bad Day at Black Rock
- Bad Times at the El Royale
- Barbershop
- Beauty and the Beast: The Enchanted Christmas
- Before Midnight
- Before Sunrise
- Before Sunset
- Before We Go
- Ben Is Back
- Bicycle Thieves
- Blackmail (1929)
- The Blob
- Bodies Bodies Bodies
- The Body Remembers When the World Broke Open
- The Boys in the Band (1970)
- The Boys in the Band (2020)
- The Breakfast Club
- Britain in a Day
- Broken Arrow (1996)
- Buffalo '66
- Bullet Train
- Buried
- Burn
- Burnt by the Sun
- Can't Hardly Wait
- The Captain
- Car Wash
- Carnage (2011)
- The Cat in the Hat
- Cat on a Hot Tin Roof
- Cause for Alarm!
- Celebration Day
- Cellular
- Certified Copy
- Changing Lanes
- Changing the Game
- Chennaiyil Oru Naal
- A Christmas Carol (1938)
- A Christmas Carol (1984)
- A Christmas Carol (1999)
- A Christmas Carol (2009)
- Cinderella III: A Twist in Time
- Cléo from 5 to 7
- Clerks.
- Clockwise
- Cloverfield
- Clue
- Cocktail (2010)
- Collateral
- The Commuter
- Connected
- Cop Car
- Cornered!
- Cosmopolis
- Crank
- Crash Landing
- Crayon Shin-chan: Fierceness That Invites Storm! Yakiniku Road of Honor
- Criminal
- Critters
- The Daytrippers
- Dazed and Confused
- Death and the Maiden
- The Debut
- Déficit
- Demon Slayer: Kimetsu no Yaiba the Movie: Mugen Train
- Detective Conan: Private Eye in the Distant Sea
- Detective Conan: The Private Eyes' Requiem
- Detective Story
- Deterrence
- Devil (2010)
- Die Hard
- Die Hard 2
- Die Hard with a Vengeance
- Digimon Frontier: Island of Lost Digimon
- Digimon Savers: Ultimate Power! Activate Burst Mode!!
- The Dinner
- Dirty Mary, Crazy Larry
- Do the Right Thing
- Dog Day Afternoon
- Dr. Strangelove
- Drake & Josh Go Hollywood
- Dredd
- Dude, Where's My Car?
- Duel
- Dutchman
- Earthquake (1974)
- Ek Ruka Hua Faisla
- Elephant
- An Elephant Sitting Still
- Empire Records
- Escape from New York
- Executive Decision
- The Eye Creatures
- Fail-Safe
- Failure!
- Faithful
- Falling Down
- Fantastic Voyage
- The Fatal Encounter
- Ferris Bueller's Day Off
- Filipiñana
- The Fire Within
- First Blood
- First Day High
- Flightplan
- Four Rooms
- Frailty
- Freaky Friday (1976)
- Free Fire
- Friday (1995)
- Friday (2012)
- Friday After Next
- From Dusk till Dawn
- The Front Page
- Fruitvale Station
- Fun Size
- Gideon's Day
- Glass Onion: A Knives Out Mystery
- The Goonies
- Grand Theft Auto
- Grandma
- Gravity (2013)
- The Great Train Robbery (1903)
- Grilled
- Grown Ups 2
- Guess Who's Coming to Dinner
- Halloween II (1981)
- Halloweentown
- Happy Death Day
- Hard Candy
- Harold & Kumar Go to White Castle
- The Hateful Eight
- A Haunting in Venice
- Heart of America
- Heretic
- The High and the Mighty
- High Noon
- His Girl Friday
- The Hollywood Knights
- Holy Motors
- Home Sweet Home
- Honey, I Blew Up the Kid
- Honey, We Shrunk Ourselves
- The House of Yes
- House Party
- House Party 4: Down to the Last Minute
- I Love You, Beth Cooper
- I Wanna Hold Your Hand
- The Ice Harvest
- The Iceman Cometh (1973)
- The Incident
- Intimate Strangers (2018)
- Intruder (1989)
- Invasion of the Saucer Men
- It's a Mad, Mad, Mad, Mad World
- Jeff, Who Lives at Home
- Jingle All the Way
- Judgment Night
- Juno and the Paycock
- Kids
- The Killing Jar
- The Killing Room
- Kings and Desperate Men
- La Haine
- La Notte
- Laid to Rest
- Las Vegas Bloodbath
- The Last Hurrah
- Last Night (1998)
- Last Swim (2024 film)
- Lebanon
- Life in a Day (2011)
- Light It Up
- Locke
- Long Day's Journey into Night (1962)
- Long Day's Journey into Night (1973)
- The Longest Daycare
- Losin' It
- Mahishasur Marddini - A Night to Remember
- Ma Rainey's Black Bottom
- Mad City
- Magnolia
- Malcolm & Marie
- Mallrats
- Margin Call
- Mars Needs Moms
- The Menu
- Miss Pettigrew Lives for a Day
- Mixed Nuts
- Money Monster
- Monster Mash (1995)
- The Muppet Christmas Carol
- Murder by Death
- My Dear Enemy
- My Dinner with Andre
- My Soul to Take
- The Negotiator
- Nerve (2016)
- New Year's Eve (2011)
- New York Minute
- Next Friday
- Nick of Time
- 'night, Mother
- Night of the Living Dead (1968)
- Night of the Living Dead (1990)
- Night on Earth
- Nine Lives (2005)
- Nine Queens
- Non-Stop
- Nothing to Lose
- No Through Road
- Odd Man Out
- Offside
- On the Town
- One Day in the Life of Ivan Denisovich
- One Fine Day
- One Night Only (2026)
- One Wonderful Sunday
- Orr Eravuu
- Our Relations
- Out for Justice
- The Pagemaster
- Pandorum
- Panic Room
- The Paper
- Penny Dreadful
- Perfect Strangers (2016)
- The Petrified Forest
- Phantom of the Megaplex
- Phone Booth
- Picnic
- Pieces of April
- The Polar Express
- Poseidon
- Premature
- Premium Rush
- The Prince and the Pauper (1990)
- Project X (2012)
- Psycho Cop
- Psycho Cop 2
- PTU
- Quarantine (2008)
- Quarantine 2: Terminal
- Quick Change
- Radioland Murders
- Rat Race
- Rebel Without a Cause
- REC
- Red Eye
- Repo! The Genetic Opera
- Retribution
- The Return of the Living Dead
- Rock 'n' Roll Nightmare
- The Rocky Horror Picture Show
- Roger Dodger
- Room in Rome
- Rope
- The Rugrats Movie
- Run (1991)
- Run Lola Run
- Running Scared (2006)
- The Russians Are Coming, the Russians Are Coming
- Sanctum
- Saturday Night (2024)
- Scooby-Doo 2: Monsters Unleashed
- Scooby-Doo! in Where's My Mummy?
- Scrooge (1935)
- Scrooge (1951)
- Scrooge (1970)
- The Set-Up
- Seven Chances
- Shiva Baby (2020)
- Short Eyes
- Shrek Forever After
- Shttl
- Shutter
- Silent House
- The Silent House
- A Single Man
- Sixteen Candles
- The Sitter
- Slacker
- Slashers
- The Slumber Party Massacre
- Snake Eyes (1998)
- The Song Remains the Same
- Sorry, Wrong Number
- Source Code
- A Special Day
- Speed (1994)
- Stan Helsing
- Steve
- The Strangers
- Stress Is Three
- The Stupids
- SubUrbia
- Sudden Death
- Suddenly
- Superbad
- The Swimmer
- Take Me Home Tonight
- The Outfit (2022)
- The Taking of Pelham One Two Three (1974)
- The Taking of Pelham 123 (2009)
- Tape
- The Texas Chain Saw Massacre
- Three
- Three O'Clock High
- Through a Glass Darkly
- The Thursday
- Timecode
- The Towering Inferno
- Touch of Evil
- Traffic (2011)
- Training Day
- Trap (2024)
- The Trench
- Trick 'r Treat
- Turbulence
- Twitches
- Two Girls and a Guy
- Two-Minute Warning
- Ulysses
- Ultraviolet
- United 93
- Unstoppable (2010)
- Vacancy
- Vacancy 2: The First Cut
- Valentine's Day (2010)
- Vantage Point
- A Very Harold & Kumar Christmas
- Waiting...
- The Warriors
- We All Die Alone
- Wet Hot American Summer
- Wet Wilderness
- What Happened Was
- When a Killer Calls
- While She Was Out
- White House Down
- Who Is Harry Kellerman and Why Is He Saying Those Terrible Things About Me?
- Who's Afraid of Virginia Woolf?
- Willy's Wonderland
- Winter Light
- Women in Trouble
- Working Girls (1986)
- World Trade Center
- Zathura: A Space Adventure
- Zulu

== See also ==
- Category:Novels set in one day
