= The Story of Mr Sommer =

1985 novel by Patrick Süskind

Die Geschichte von Herrn Sommer The Story of Mr Sommer
- First edition of the book
- Author: Patrick Süskind
- Translator: Michael Hofmann
- Cover artist: Jean-Jacques Sempé
- Language: German
- Genre: Novella with autobiographical elements
- Set in: fictional village in Germany, 1950s
- Publisher: Diogenes; Fox, Finch & Tepper; Bloomsbury Publishing
- Publication date: 1991
- Media type: Print (Hardback & paperback); Audio book

The Story of Mr Sommer (Die Geschichte von Herrn Sommer) is a novella in German by Patrick Süskind, published in 1991, dealing with memories of childhood in a village in Germany. The book was illustrated by Jean-Jacques Sempé. It was translated into English by Michael Hofmann.

== History ==
After Süskind had written Perfume about a serial killer in 1985, and The Pigeon as a kafkaesque story in 1987, he turned to a boy's childhood memories in Die Geschichte von Herrn Sommer. The book is related to the author's own childhood in a village on Lake Starnberg, reviewed at around age 40. Jeffrey Adams, a scholar of media studies, described it as "a children's tale for adults" in its entry in The Literary Encyclopedia.

The book was richly illustrated by drawings by Jean-Jacques Sempé, and published by Diogenes in Zürich in 1991. A translation into English by Michael Hofmann, The Story of Mr Sommer, was first published by Fox, Finch & Tepper in Bath. It was published by Bloomsbury Publishing as a paperback in 2003.

== Plot and themes ==
Die Geschichte von Herrn Sommer is told in the first person by a man aged around 40, remembering growing up in a fictional village in Germany after World War II. The narration features elements reminiscent of fairy-tales of the Brothers Grimm, such as the boy being sure he could fly if only he was determined enough. It is written as if told spontaneously, described as a "beguiling, unsentimental account of childhood in rural Germany" of a "clever, imaginative, logical and lonely little boy". He remembers living away from other children, being attracted to his classmate Carolina, and enduring piano lessons that he reached riding his mother's bike, too large for him.

The narrator meets an unusual man, Herr Sommer, who is described as from the same village where the boy lives but on restless permanent wanderings (Wanderschaft), from early morning until late at night. Three meetings are described in detail. The first occurs during a terrible storm and hail when the boy and his father, returning from a horse race by car, offer him a ride, and he utters the only spoken phrase quoted in the book: "Ja so laßt mich doch endlich in Frieden!" ("Why don’t you just leave me in peace!"). The boy meets him again, watching from a high tree which he climbed with the idea of ending his life by jumping; Mr Sommer unusually interrupts his walk, lies down in the grass and lets go a gruesome long groan ("a hollow anguished sound from deep within his chest") that makes the boy forget his intentions. In the end, the boy watches the man walk into the lake where he drowns, as Ludwig II of Bavaria died. The boy keeps it to himself.

== Publication ==
- Die Geschichte von Herrn Sommer. Mit Bildern von Sempé. Diogenes, Zürich 1991, ISBN 3-257-01895-9. (first edition)
- Die Geschichte von Herrn Sommer. Mit Bildern von Sempé. Diogenes, Zürich 1994, ISBN 3-257-22664-0. (paperback)
- The Story of Mr Sommer. translated by Michael Hofmann, Fox, Finch & Tepper, ISBN 978-0-99-304672-8
- The Story of Mr Sommer. Bloomsbury Publishing 2003, ISBN 0-7475-6675-5 (paperback)
- Die Geschichte von Herrn Sommer. Mit Bildern von Sempé. Diogenes, Zürich 2012, ISBN 978-3-257-05728-7. (new edition)
- Die Geschichte von Herrn Sommer. 2 audio CDs, read by Hans Korte. Diogenes, Zürich 2006, ISBN 3-257-80017-7. (audio book)
