= Aus dem Wörterbuch des Unmenschen =

From the Dictionary of an Inhuman (German title: Aus dem Wörterbuch des Unmenschen) is a work by Dolf Sternberger, Gerhard Storz and W. E. Süskind, first published in book form in 1957 (revised and expanded) by Claassen (de) in Hamburg, and later issued as a paperback in 1962 by dtv in Munich.

The authors’ reflections on the "language of inhumanity" were first published in 1945/46 in the monthly magazine Die Wandlung. A column entitled "Aus dem Wörterbuch des Unmenschen" appeared in three annual volumes of the monthly periodical between 1945 and 1948.

It was one of the first works to address the language of National Socialism immediately after the end of the Nazi regime. As Dolf Sternberger (abbreviated as "d. st.") stated in his 1957 foreword: "May it help to open eyes, sharpen hearing, make tongues ashamed, and finally restore to them their natural fluency!" („Möge es helfen, die Augen zu öffnen, das Gehör zu schärfen, die Zungen schamhaft zu machen und ihnen schließlich ihre natürliche Geläufigkeit zurückzugeben!“)

According to the magazine Manova, the book is "a collection of terms that were used in Germany by the National Socialists—and their henchmen in institutions and the media—to spread Nazi ideology and to bring the people of the state into line with a common worldview."

The writer W. E. Süskind (1901–1970) worked as an editor at the Deutsche Verlags-Anstalt (de) in Stuttgart. He published his first novel Jugend in 1930 and served from 1933 to 1943 as editor of the journal Die Literatur. After the war he reported on the Nuremberg trials (in the volume Die Mächtigen vor Gericht, 1963) and from 1949 onward was senior editor at the Süddeutsche Zeitung.

== See also ==
- LTI (Victor Klemperer)
- Słowa niewinne (Nachman Blumental)

== Bibliography ==
- Dolf Sternberger, Gerhard Storz and Wilhelm Emanuel Süskind: Aus dem Wörterbuch des Unmenschen. Claassen, Hamburg 1957
- Dolf Sternberger; Gerhard Storz; W. E. Süskind: Aus dem Wörterbuch des Unmenschen. dtv paperback no. 48, Munich: Deutscher Taschenbuch Verlag, 1962 (digitized edition)
- Rudolph Bauer: Kritisches Wörterbuch des Bunten Totalitarismus. Heft 2: I bis N. pad-Verlag, Bergkamen, 2024. ISBN 388515370X
- Bill Dodd: Jedes Wort wandelt die Welt: Dolf Sternbergers politische Sprachkritik. Göttingen: Wallstein Verlag, 2007. ISBN 3835302302 / ISBN 9783835302303
