= Gerhard Storz =

- Born: 19 August 1898; Rottenacker, Kingdom of Württemberg, German Empire
- Died: 30 August 1983; Leonberg, Baden-Württemberg, West Germany
- Education: University of Tübingen
- Occupations: stage actor theatre director-producer school teacher educationalist politician university teacher author-journalist essayist
- Political party: CDU
- Spouse(s): 1. Martha Rothweiler; 2. Edith Baum
- Children: Oliver Storz (1929–2011)
- Parent(s): Otto Storz (1857–1942); Hanna Majer

Gerhard Storz (19 August 1898 – 30 August 1983) was the son of a Lutheran pastor from Württemberg who at various stages distinguished himself in theatre productions, as a scholar, an educationalist, a politician and an author-journalist, sometimes pursuing one career at a time and sometimes several in combination. Throughout his adult life he liked to see himself as a "language therapist". "Human speech seems to have been encoded, sealed into formulaic structures, and pressed into service for mechanistic operations" ("Menschliche Rede scheint chiffriert worden zu sein, versiegelt in Formeln, hineingepreßt in mechanische Funktionen"), he once wrote.

== Life ==
=== Provenance and early years ===
Gerhard Storz was born in Rottenacker, a village along the upper reaches of the Danube in the hills to the south west of Ulm. Otto Storz (1857–1942), his father, was a Lutheran pastor who was assigned to a succession of parishes in the area during Gerhard's childhood. His paternal grandmother had been a great grand daughter of the philosopher Jacob Friedrich von Abel, known to literature scholars as a teacher and friend of Friedrich Schiller.

He attended school at Ehingen and then between 1916 and 1918, served as a volunteer in the wartime army. He attended Tübingen University between 1919 and 1922, studying Classical philology, Archaeology, Philosophy and Germanistics. He received his doctorate for a dissertation entitled "The linguistic presentation of the concept of truth in Greek literature before Plato" ("Die sprachliche Darstellung des Wahrheitsbegriffes in der griechischen Literatur vor Plato"). The work was supervised by Wilhelm Schmid. As a student Storz was a member of the Tübinger Königsgesellschaft Roigel, the university's prestigious student fraternity. Meanwhile he passed his level 1 teaching exams in 1922 and his level 2 teaching exams in 1923.In parallel to all this he managed to find time to study stagecraft at a drama school.

=== Theatre ===
Although his education had prepared him, principally, for a career as a teacher, it was now the theatre to which he turned for the next few years. He worked at the Württembergische Volksbühne Theatre in Stuttgart as an actor-producer ("Oberspielleiter") between 1923 and 1925. He then moved to the Badisches Staatstheater (subsequently rebuilt) in Karlsruhe where he stayed till 1927 before moving on again, this time to the National Theatre Mannheim. In 1931 he took a senior post as a producer-director at the Stadttheater in Saarbrücken and in 1934/35 he moved north to the Stadttheater in Dortmund

=== Teacher ===
By this time his theatre career had become a part-time one. In 1932 he entered the schools service, becoming a teaching assistant ("Studienassessor") at a secondary school in Biberach. After the conclusion of his theatre career, in 1935 Storz moved to Schwäbisch Hall, where he took a position at the "Gymnasium bei St. Michael" (secondary school) as a teacher of German and Latin. He remained at the school till 1943, described during this period by his son as "a committed teacher, a convinced humanist and a secret opponent of National Socialism", able to conduct discrete but regular "reality checks" with his fellow intellectual and friend, Dolf Sternberger, who was also secretly opposed to the Nazi project.

In January 1933 the Nazis had taken power and lost little time in transforming Germany into a one-party dictatorship. On 1 June 1933 Gerhard Storz became a member of the party sponsored Nazi Teachers' Association ("Nationalsozialistische Lehrerbund" / NSLB). This would have been seen as a necessary precondition for a career switch into the schools sector. It was also in 1935 that Storz's first marriage ended in divorce after seven years. Martha married Pavel Hackel the next year, and the couple had to leave German "for political reasons". They would live in exile in South Africa till 1960 Gerhard Schorz would remarry only in 1944.

Not for the first time, Storz sustained a parallel second career, writing for the Frankfurter Zeitung (newspaper) between 1935 and 1943, when after the withdrawal of government support and several years of declining readership the newspaper was suppressed. Around this time his second marriage broke up. By 1943 the invasion of the Soviet Union was faltering and the tide of the war had turned against Germany. The government responded in February 1943 with a public declaration of "total war". Despite his age Storz was conscripted for military service. War ended and in November 1945 he was able to return from war service and imprisonment. He returned to the school in Schwäbisch Hall where he had been teaching before his conscription: in 1947 he was appointed school director (head). Characteristically, for much of this time he also help a position as director of studies at the newly established teacher training academy housed in the former monastery on the Comburg (hill) on the north side of the town.

=== Politics ===
Storz also had contacts in the world of politics. In Schwäbisch Hall he became a local councillor. He was a founder member of the CDU (party). and one of the founders of a local CDU branch. During the years of occupation he demonstrated personal commitment to constructing a democratic future for Germany.

In 1958 he accepted an invitation from Minister-president Gebhard Müller to join the regional government of Baden-Württemberg. The state had only come into being in 1952 as the consequence of a merger of three smaller federal states established by the US military administration in the immediate aftermath of the war. As Minister for Culture in a recently formed state Storz oversaw a major reform programme of the secondary schools. He expanded the network of education colleges and involved himself in plans for the (re-)establishment, during the 1960s, of universities in Konstanz in Ulm. However, he resigned his office in 1964, a couple of years before the new universities opened their doors.

Following his retirement from the political front-line Storz became an honorary professor at his alma mater. He also accepted guest professorships in the United States, notably at Middlebury, Vermont (1963) and Kansas, Lawrence (1965). Between 1966 and 1972 he served as president of the Darmstadt-based German Academy for Language and Literature ("Deutsche Akademie für Sprache und Dichtung") (of which he had been a member since its foundation in 1949). Within the Academy he consistently opposed the more radical proposals for spelling reform "Rechtschreibung" that were already appearing on the political agenda in the 1950s. (The Academy has continued to resist successive "Rechtschreibung" proposals since his departure.)

== Output ==
From as early 1927 Gerhard Storz was a writer of scholarly and literary pieces and a compiler of translations. Between 1948 and 1968 he collaborated with Fritz Martini, Friedrich Maurer and Robert Ulshöfer to produce the academic journal, "Der Deutschunterricht" (loosely: "Teaching German"). Between 1945 and 1948 he joined with Dolf Sternberger and Wilhelm E. Süskind to provide contributions to Die Wandlung (loosely "The Changeling") in a series which later appeared as a book under the title "From the Dictionary of Inhumanity" ("Aus dem Wörterbuch des Unmenschen"), analysing the changes and manipulations of the German language implemented by the National Socialists.

=== Standalone pieces (selection) ===
- Das Theater in der Gegenwart. Eine zeitkritische Betrachtung. Karlsruhe 1927
- Laienbrevier über den Umgang mit der Sprache. Frankfurt a. Main 1937
- Der Lehrer. Erzählung. Frankfurt a. Main 1937 under the pseudonym Georg Leitenberger)
- Das Drama Friedrich Schillers. Frankfurt a. Main 1937
- Musik auf dem Lande. Mit 15 Zeichnungen von Albert Fuß, Frankfurt a. Main 1939 (unter dem Pseudonym Georg Leitenberger)
- Der immerwährende Garten. Eine Erzählung. (unter dem Pseudonym Georg Leitenberger), Tübingen 1940
- Gedanken über die Dichtung. Frankfurt a. Main 1941
- Die Einquartierung. Erzählung. Stuttgart 1946
- Jeanne d'Arc und Schiller. Eine Studie über das Verhältnis von Dichtung und Wirklichkeit. Freiburg i Br. 1947
- Der Lehrer. Erzählung. Stuttgart 1948
- Reise nach Frankreich. Erzählung. Stuttgart 1948
- Umgang mit der Sprache. Stuttgart 1948
- Goethe-Vigilien oder Versuche in der Kunst, Dichtung zu verstehen. Stuttgart 1953
- Kennst du das Land...? Italien Con Amore bereist von Gerhard Storz. (Kleine Turmhausbücherei, H. 9), Stuttgart 1955
- Sprache und Dichtung. München 1957
- with Dolf Sternberger und Wilhelm Emanuel Süskind: Aus dem Wörterbuch des Unmenschen. Hamburg 1957
- Der Dichter Schiller. Stuttgart 1959
- Friedrich Schiller. (Athenäum-Schriften, Bd. 2), Frankfurt a. Main/Bonn 1960
- Figuren und Prospekte. Ausblicke auf Dichter und Mimen. Sprache und Landschaft, Stuttgart 1963
- 40 Jahre Freilichtspiele Schwäbisch Hall. Schwäbisch Hall 1966
- Schwäbische Romantik. Dichter und Dichterkreis im alten Württemberg. Stuttgart 1967
- Heinrich Heines Lyrische Dichtung. Stuttgart 1971
- Im Lauf der Jahre. Ein Lebensbericht aus der ersten Jahrhunderthälfte. Stuttgart 1973
- Sprachanalyse ohne Sprache. Bemerkungen zur modernen Linguistik. (Versuche, Bd. 21), Stuttgart 1975
- Das Spiel auf der Treppe. Freilichtspiele Schwäbisch Hall. Schwäbisch Hall 1975
- Zwischen Amt und Neigung. Ein Lebensbericht aus der Zeit nach 1945. Stuttgart 1976
- Capriccios. Stuttgart 1978
- Das Wort als Zeichen und Wirklichkeit. Von der Zwienatur der Sprache. Ein Essay. Stuttgart 1980
- Karl Eugen. Der Fürst und das „alte gute Recht“ Stuttgart 1981
- Deutsch als Aufgabe und Vergnügen. Stuttgart 1984
