= Wilhelm Emanuel Süskind =

Wilhelm Emanuel Süskind (10 June 1901, Weilheim – 17 April 1970, Tutzing) was a German writer, journalist and translator.

Süskind was editorial journalist for politics with Süddeutsche Zeitung. Along with his own works he translated books into German, e.g. works of Tania Blixen or Herman Melville.

Wilhelm Emanuel Süskind is the father of author Patrick Süskind (Perfume) and was a school day friend of Erika and Klaus Mann.

== Literary works ==
- Vom ABC zum Sprachkunstwerk. Eine deutsche Sprachlehre für Erwachsene; Düsseldorf 1960
- Aus dem Wörterbuch des Unmenschen (with Dolf Sternberger & Gerhard Storz); Hamburg 1968 (3rd edition)
