= Jupiter and Antiope (Watteau) =

Painting by Antoine Watteau

- Jupiter et Antiope (French)
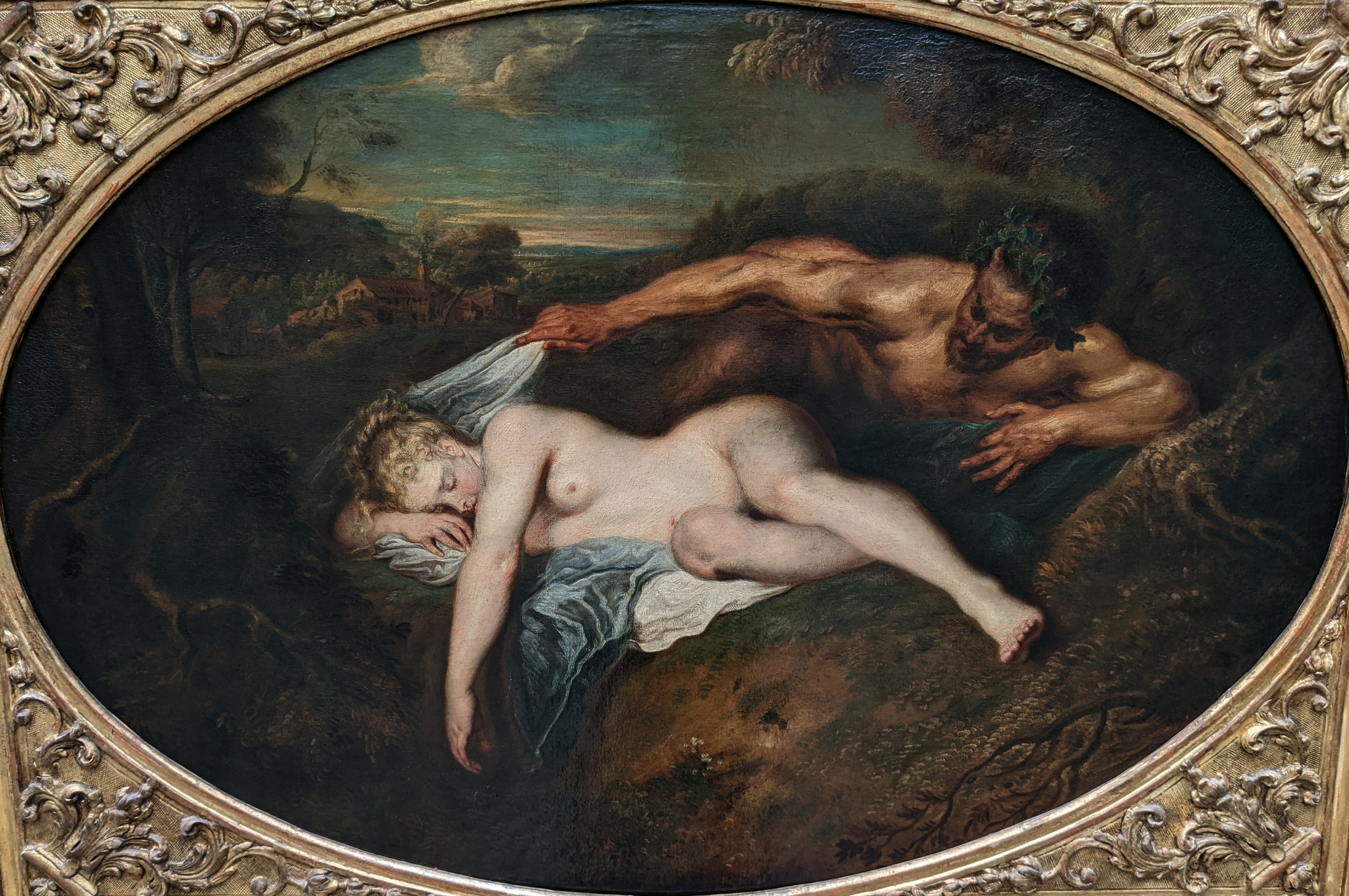
- Artist: Antoine Watteau
- Year: c. 1714–1719
- Type: Oil painting
- Dimensions: 73 cm × 107.5 cm (29 in × 42.3 in)
- Location: Louvre; Paris

Jupiter and Antiope (French: Jupiter et Antiope) is an oil painting by the French artist Antoine Watteau. It is also known as the Satyr and the Sleeping Nymph and was probably painted between 1714 and 1719. Intended to be placed over a doorway, today it hangs in the Musée du Louvre in Paris.

== Description ==
The painting is oval shaped, with a width of 107.5 cm and a height of 73 cm. In the foreground it depicts the naked, sleeping Antiope. She lies with her head on the left edge of the painting, twisted so that her front side faces the viewer. Her right arm is bent under her head while her left arm hangs down into the abyss in front of her. This arm covers the right breast, while the left remains free. Her legs are bent up towards the viewer, with the right continuing the line of her body at the knee while her left leg is only slightly bent to point back to the lower right of the painting. The whole body is painted in pale, warm colours and lights up the otherwise dark and earthy image. Under the sleeping woman there is a cloth, which hangs over the abyss near her breast, disappears under her arm near her head and is lifted by the satyr behind her.

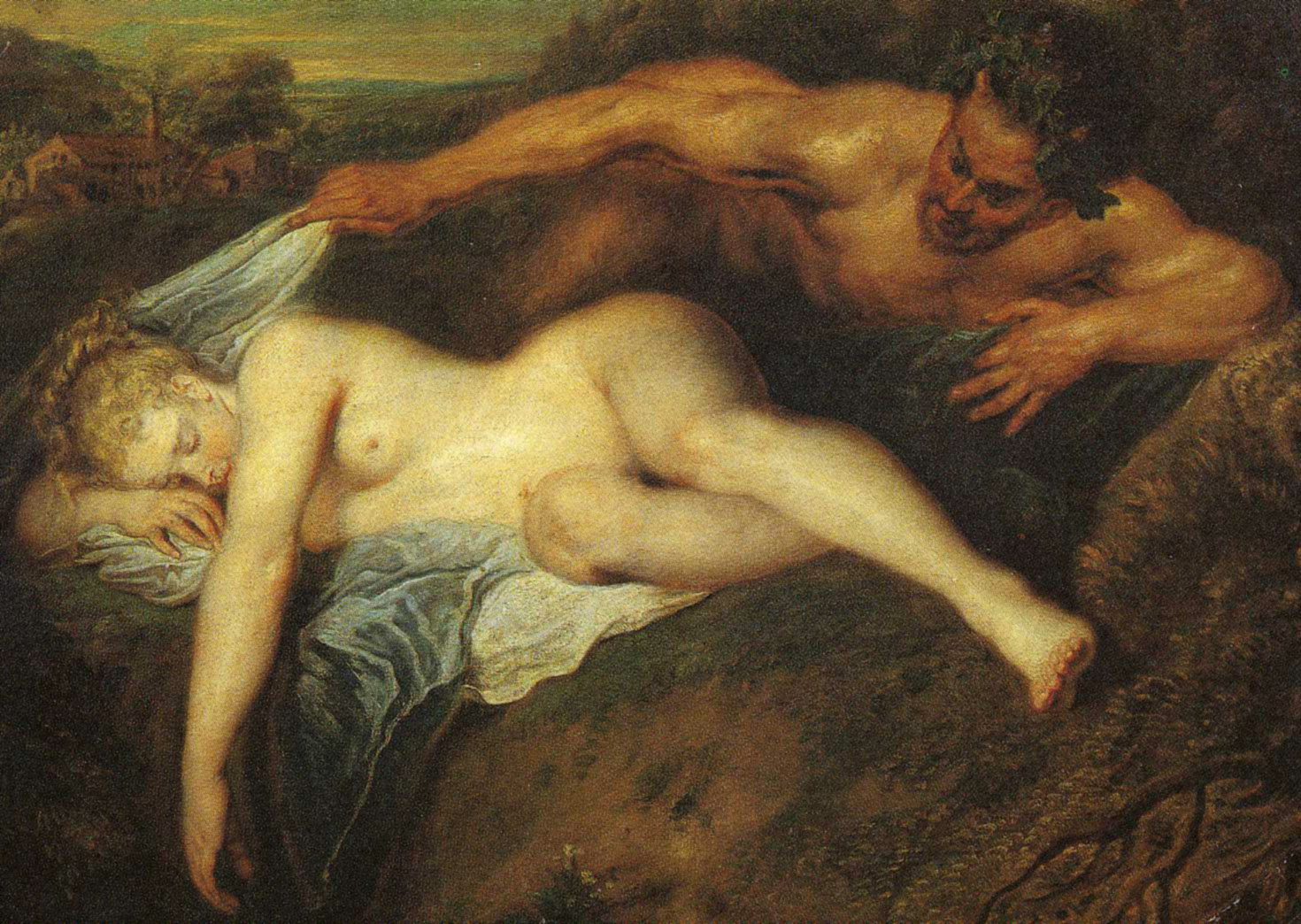
Jupiter and Antiope, detail

The satyr, whose head is crowned with grape vines symbolising the presence of the god Bacchus, lies in the opposite direction behind the woman, with the front of his body also facing the viewer. With his left arm he lifts the cloth to the height of Antiope's shoulder and it is obvious that he has just uncovered the sleeping maiden. His left arm is bent on a tree root at the right edge of the image and props up his upper body. With his head and upper body, the satyr looms over the hips of the sleeper in order to gaze upon her – he licks his lips lustfully. His body is shadowy and cannot be made out below his hips. The satyr is depicted in brown tones. His suntanned skin and muscular body forms a clear contrast with the softly worked, shapely Antiope.

The lower edge of the image is taken up by an abyss, which is depicted in dark brown tones and is edged with bare soil. On either side, gnarled roots grow in the soil, which rise into indistinct trees. The ground continues above the trees into the background, where there is a hill with lone houses. Above that is the cloudy sky, discreetly lit by the glow of twilight.

The composition fits the oval shape of the image. The sleeping Antiope forms the central horizontal, with her hips and bent legs creating the central vertical. The arms of the satyr and the legs of the woman curve in parallel with the upper edge of the painting – in this way the two central characters repeat the oval within the image, which is broken only by dangling left arm of the woman. Spatial depth is created by the stooped posture of Jupiter and by the bent knees of Antiope.

== Mythological background and reception in art ==
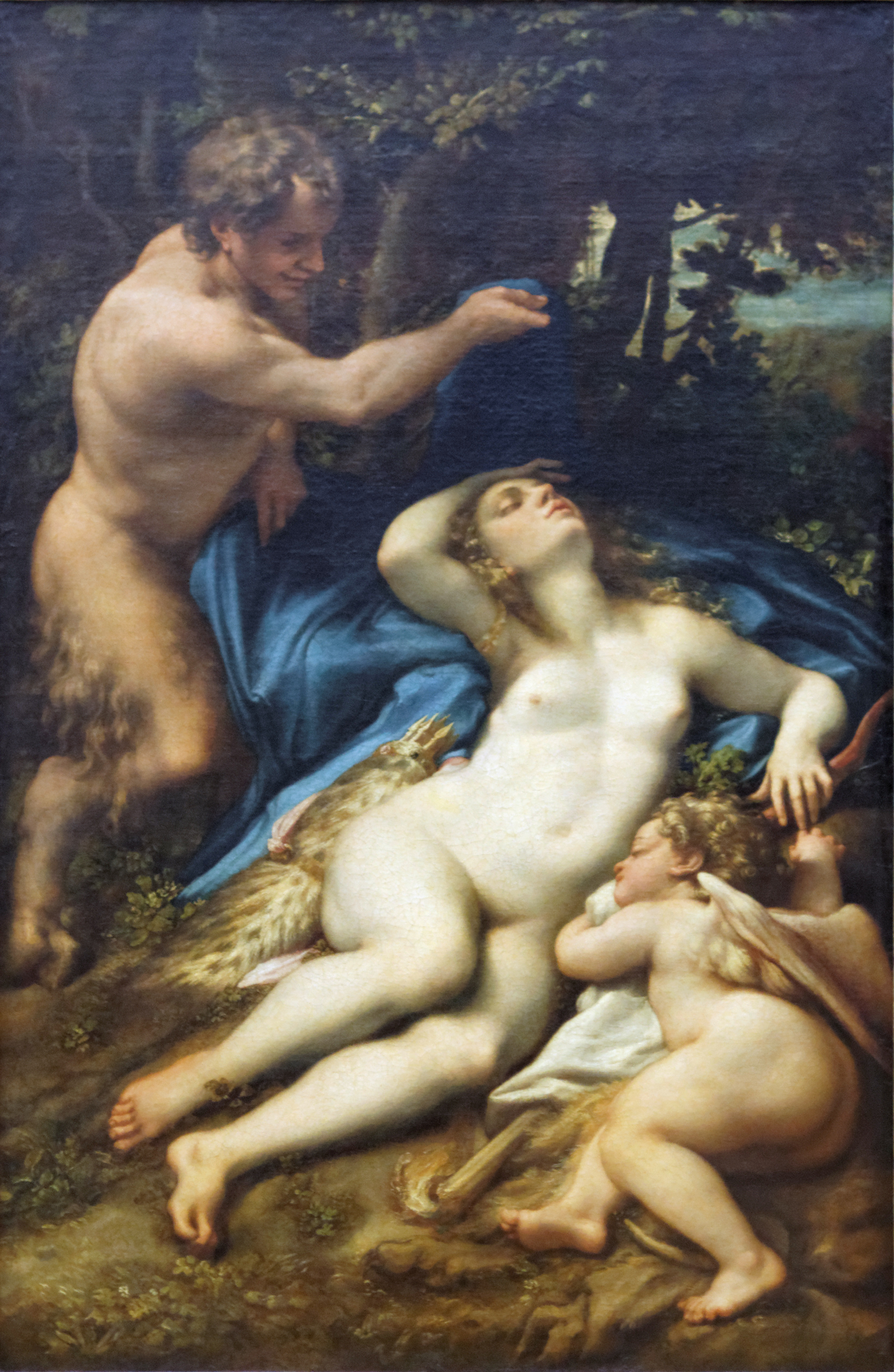
Correggio, Jupiter and Antiope (with Eros), c.1528

The painting comes out of the story of the seduction of Antiope by the god Zeus in Greek mythology, later imported into Roman mythology and told of the god Jupiter. According to this myth, Antiope, the beautiful daughter of King Nycteus of Thebes, was surprised and seduced by Zeus in the form of a satyr. She became pregnant and bore the twins Amphion and Zethus, who later killed Nycteus' brother Lycus in revenge for his treatment of Antiope and took over the city of Thebes.

=== Satyr and Nymph ===
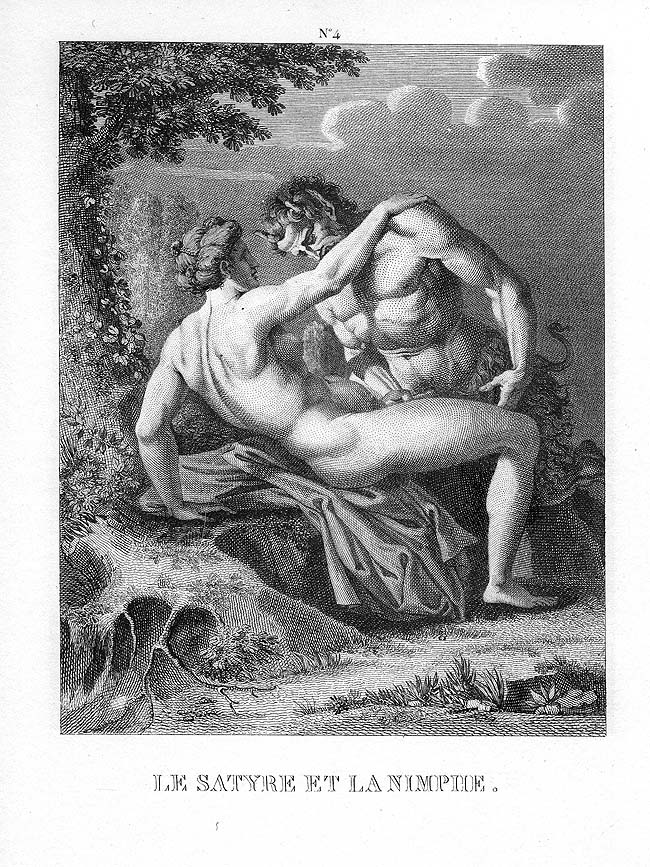
Agostino Carracci: Le Satyre et la Nymphe

Satyrs and nymphs form two extremes in Greek mythology, which are united only by their instinctive natures. While the nymph was the source of the psychological term nymphomania (now hypersexuality), the satyr was the source of the once common but now outdated term satyriasis and can be understood as the nymph's male equivalent.

Accordingly, both nymphs and satyrs are very regularly depicted in mythology – and thence also in their subsequent artistic reception – in erotic contexts and are accordingly favoured topics of art. In addition there is a clear aesthetic contrast between the two stereotypes. The nymph is in general very beautiful and physically perfect. They were mostly depicted with ivory, light and very delicate colours and an idealised female form, having close similarities with depictions of Venus. On the other hand, the satyrs, who are the followers of Bacchus, are very ugly, with the horns, legs and sometimes the tail of a goat. They are also strong, muscular, and tanned. Thus nymphs and satyrs present an optical contrast, which could hardly be any stronger and which makes them a perfect pair for artistic purposes.

== Creation and context ==
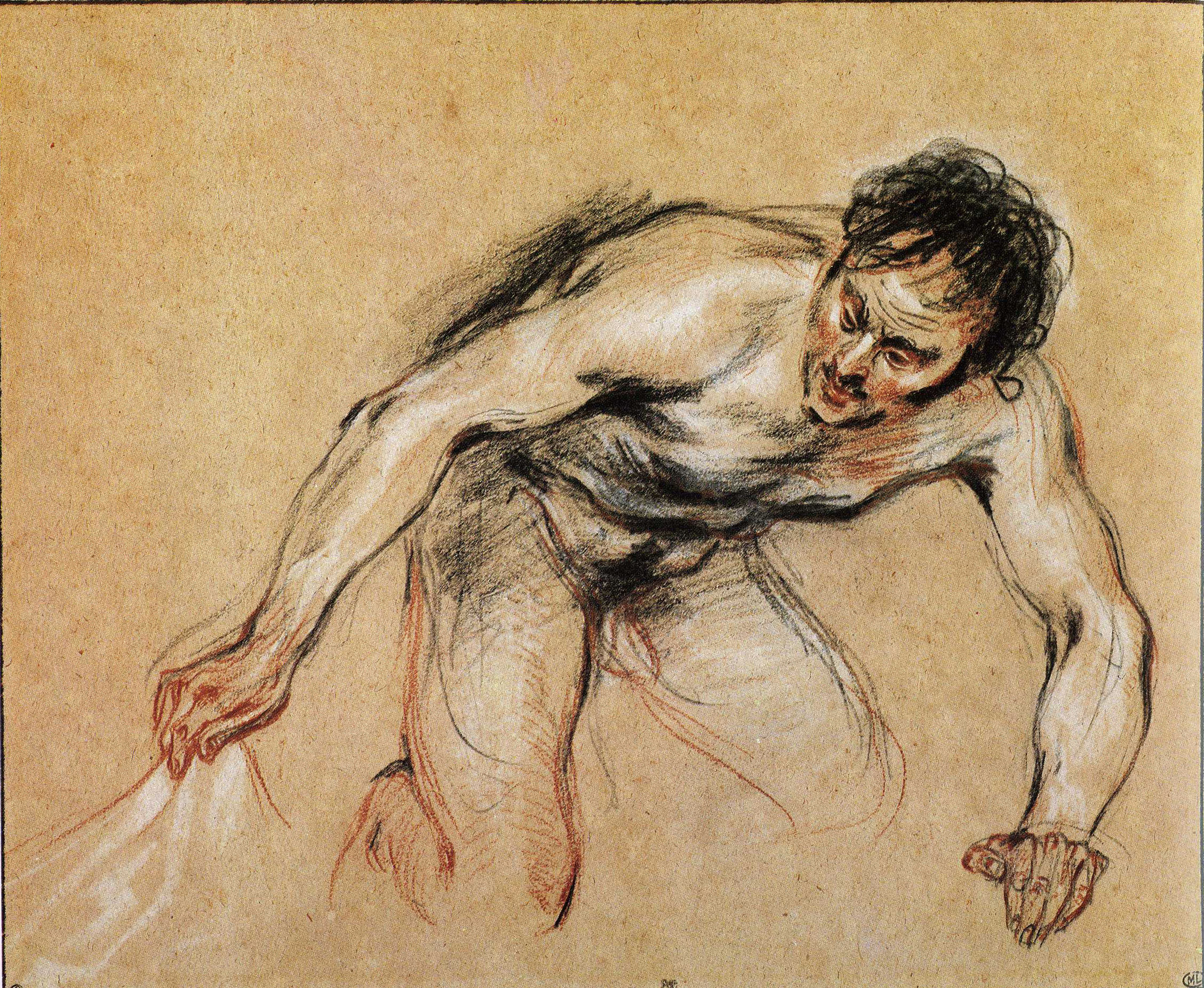
Sketch for Jupiter and Antiope

The circumstances of the painting's creation are not entirely clear (see below). In the art historical literature, the assumption that the painting was created as a commission for the banker Pierre Crozat under the instruction of Watteau's teacher Charles de La Fosse around the time of the creation of the four Seasons prevails. La Fosse encouraged Watteau who had not practiced history painting hitherto to take on the work of the allegories of the Seasons, since he himself was not in the neighbourhood anymore. The Seasons seem to have been designed as oval paintings with mythological scenes intended to decorate Crozat's dining room.

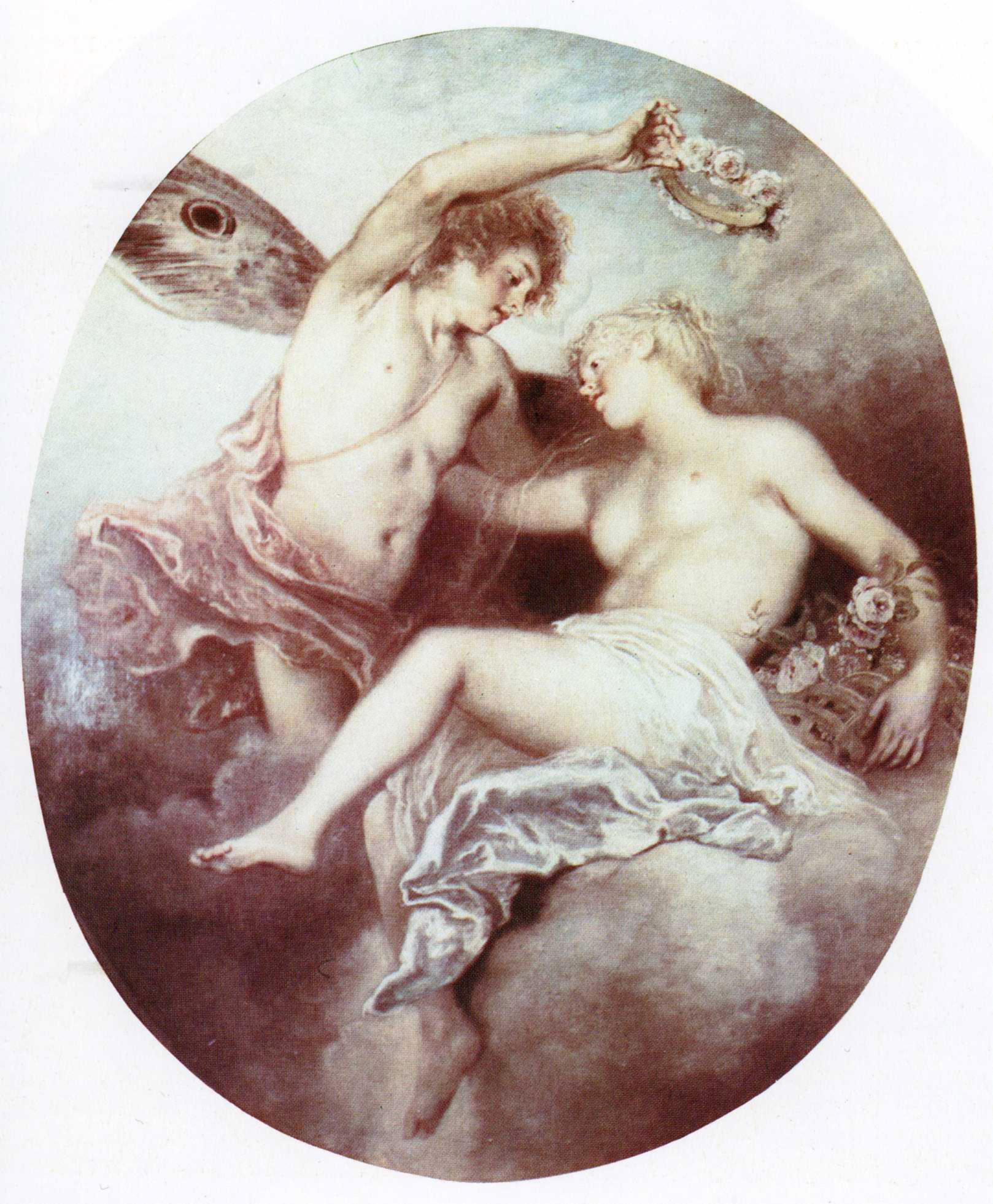
Spring, one of the Seasons

In parallel with this series, Watteau produced a range of other paintings, which dealt with the theme of the mythological nude in this same oval format which was at that time unusual. At first he painted a number of historical images in the classical format, following Italian and Netherlandish classics, after which he next created Jupiter and Antiope, the seasons and three further seasons in the oval format: another Autumn, Venus Disarming Amor and the Morning Toilette.

Models for the painting of Jupiter and Antiope included the paintings of the same name by Antonio da Correggio and Titian as well as the Descent from the Cross of the Dutch painter Anthony van Dyck, from which the arrangement of the satyr's arms is taken.

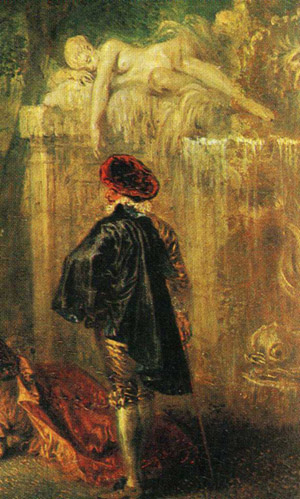
Detail from The Elysian Fields, c.1719

During his preparation for the Jupiter and Antiope, at least three sketches were created by Watteau, in which he attempted to work the satyr out. These include a drawing of the satyr in kneeling position and one in the reclining pose which he finally selected. No sketches of Antiope are known, but Watteau had already produced a great number of female nudes and studies which he could draw on for this painting. Finally, an image now lost showed the whole image and was used by the engraver Anne-Claude-Philippe, Comte de Caylus as model for a copper engraving which was first published by Jules de Jullienne.

Watteau returned to the theme of the sleeping nymph in his 1719 painting The Elysian Fields, a scene of the gardens of the Champs-Élysées in Paris. Here he depicted a stone copy of Antiope wearing a crown as a monument on the pedestal at the right hand side of the painting, as a kind of "living sculpture" which is typical of Watteau. This statue is placed directly above a gallantly dressed man seen only from behind (Hagestolz) who considers the scenery as part of a group of men in the foreground (Watteau also painted a similar group of people in the Rural Pleasure of 1720, in that case standing under a statue of Venus). According to Börsch-Supan, the Hagestolz represents the natural counterpoint to the lustful satyr - he observes the figure on the pedestal with particular interest.

== Provenance ==
The history of the painting after its creation is not yet completely clear and in particular its location before 1857 remains an open question.

Probably Watteau painted the image as a commission for the merchant Pierre Crozat, for whom he also produced the series of Seasons painted at the same time. This is claimed in an exhibition catalogue from Vienna in 1966 and remains the most widely accepted theory in art history to this day, but it still cannot be proven.

In 1857 the painting appeared at the auction of the collection of Theodore Patureau in a catalogue in which it was listed as a former possession of Prince Paul d'Arenberg. Watteau maintained a friendly relationship with the ancestors of the prince in the early eighteenth century and a receipt of 14 May 1717 signed by Watteau records that he had sold two paintings to Léopold Philippe d'Arenberg. In their 1929 book Jean de Juliennes et les graveurs de Watteau au XVIII^{e} siècle E. Hérold and A. Vuaflart suggest that Jupiter and Antiope could have been one of these two paintings and develop a theory that de Ligne ordered the painting in 1714 during a trip to Paris and returned to collect the painting and pay for it three years later. Today this theory is largely rejected.

How the painting came into the possession of Paturae is no longer clear either, but he probably bought it from Price Paul d'Arenberg privately. In 1864 the Baron James Mayer de Rothschild bought the painting and then put it up for auction again in March 1868 through the art-dealer Bourlon de Sarty. It was bought by Louis La Caze who died the very next year, leaving it to the Louvre. The painting still hangs there today.

=== Conservation status and alterations ===
The conservation status of the painting is relatively poor. With the help of X-ray imaging cracked areas were restored, particularly in the sky and around the edges. Further investigations revealed that Antiope originally wore a cloth of modesty which was later removed. Whether the cloth and its subsequent removal were painted by Watteau himself is not clear. A later addition and removal is also possible. The X-ray imagery and especially Watteau's sketches and the copper engraving of Watteau's contemporary the Comte de Caylus confirm that the satyr was painted by Watteau, which was once controversial. The old theory that the final private owner, Louis La Caze had made alterations to the painting can also now be considered disproven.

== Copies ==
After its creation Jupiter and Antiope was repeatedly copied and reworked. Two copies by an unknown artist are preserved in the Louvre in the Service d’Etudes et de Documentation.

The previously mentioned copper engraving of the Comte de Caylus was created in the lifetime of Watteau and was included in Jean de Jullienne's collection Figures de différents caractères. He based his depiction not on the painting itself, but like most of his engravings on a drawing by Watteau which is now lost. A drawing of the painting by Gabriel de Saint-Aubin also existed which is today on display in the Art Institute of Chicago.

The French painter Lucien Lévy-Dhurmer painted an invented View of Watteau's Studio in 1890, in which the Jupiter and Antiope features as one of the paintings on the walls. Another painting in which the painting appears as part of the composition is the Salle La Caze painted by Édouard Vuillard in 1922. Ernest Laurent copied the image as a grisaille and a free modern interpretation was made by Claude Schurr in 1966.

== In popular culture ==
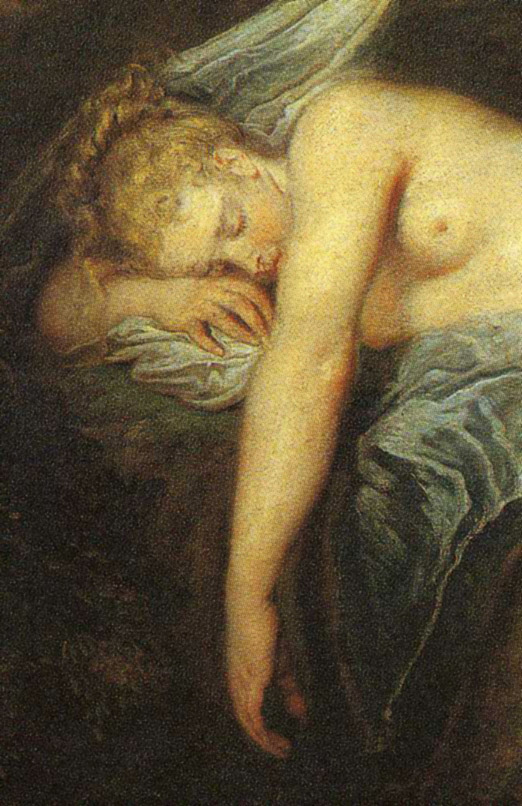
Detail on which the cover of Das Parfum was based

Patrick Süskind's novel Perfume published by Diogenes Verlag since 1985 has a detail from Jupiter and Antiope on the cover with the armpit of the naked sleeper in the centre. This might symbolise the novel's central theme of fragrant seduction. The novel was an international best seller, translated into 49 languages, with over 20 million copies sold. The same image has been used on all versions of the cover except the American paperback edition (where it was prohibited to depict a women's nipple), thus the book has made Watteau's Antiope famous worldwide.

In July 1971 Paraguay produced a postage stamp with the motif of the sleeping nymph.

== Bibliography ==
- Bailey, Colin B. (1992). The Loves of the Gods: Mythological Painting from Watteau to David (exhibition catalogue). New York; Fort Worth, TX: Rizzoli, Kimbell Art Museum. ISBN 0-8478-1521-8 – via the Internet Archive.
- Brookner, Anita (1985) [1967]. Watteau. Colour Library of Art. Feltham: Hamlyn. pp. 14, 29; colorpl. 13. ISBN 0-600-50156-6. OCLC 922565837 – via the Internet Archive.
- Camesasca, Ettore [in Portuguese] (1971). The Complete Painting of Watteau. Classics of the World's Great Art. Introduction by John Sutherland. New York: Harry N. Abrams. p. 105, cat. no. 104. ISBN 0810955253. OCLC 143069 – via the Internet Archive.
- Grasselli, Margaret Morgan; Rosenberg, Pierre & Paramantier, Nicole (1984). Watteau, 1684-1721 (PDF) (exhibition catalogue). Washington: National Gallery of Art. ISBN 0-89468-074-9. OCLC 557740787 – via the National Gallery of Art archive.
- Posner, Donald (1984). Antoine Watteau. London: Weidenfeld & Nicolson. p. 290. ISBN 0-8014-1571-3. OCLC 10736607 – via the Internet Archive.
