= Die Wandlung =

Monthly magazine

Die Wandlung was a monthly magazine published in Heidelberg between November 1945 and Autumn 1949. "Die Wandlung" has no direct equivalent in English, but the gerund "The Changing" conveys the meaning sufficiently.

"Die Wandlung ist vom Diskurs eines radikalen Bruchs mit der Vergangenheit geprägt, während "Lancelot" die Kontinuität des französischen kulturellen Erbes, aber auch einer gewissen humanistischen Tradition Deutschlands hervorhebt. In dieser Reibung zwischen zwei gegensätzlichen Zeitschriften-Konzeptionen entsteht ein Potenzial deutsch-französischer Verständigung."

"Die Wandlung is predicated on a radical break with the past, whereas "Lancelot" [, a contemporary equivalent journal that appeared in France between 1947 and 1950,] places emphasis on the French cultural heritage, along with a certain enduring humanistic tradition in Germany. In the tension that separates the underlying conceptions of the two journals there exists a potential for Franco-German understanding."

Patricia Oster, after studying a 1946 copy of "Die Wandlung"

== History and profile ==
Die Wandlung was founded by the philosophers Karl Jaspers and Dolf Sternberger, the linguist-culturalist Werner Krauss and the sociologist-economist Alfred Weber. Appearing directly after the twelve Nazi years, the publication aspired to feed a spiritual renewal for Germans, both in the western and Soviet occupation zones. Dolf Sternberger took on the role of managing editor.

Along with the journal's founders, contributors included Hannah Arendt, T. S. Eliot, Marie Luise Kaschnitz, Gerhard Storz, Wilhelm E. Süskind and Viktor von Weizsäcker. Also included were documents relating to contemporary history, and in particular National Socialism.

In the lead article of the first edition Karl Jaspers wrote that, after National Socialism, there were no longer any valid universal standards left. He would dare to take responsibility to try to find a way through this monstrous moral lacuna. For that, memories could not suffice. He wanted to base the focus of the new journal not on history but on the present and the future. After undergoing the Nazi experience, Jaspers stressed: "We do not come with a programme". Key concepts were moral renewal, responsibility, liberty and humanism.

In 1957 twenty-eight definitional contributions from Sternberger, Storz and Süskind were collected and published in a volume under the title "Aus dem Wörterbuch des Unmenschen" ("From the Dictionary of Inhumanity"). Words and phrases identified were those from the propaganda and euphemisms of Nazi period that, in the eyes of the authors, should be consigned to oblivion, but ten years after being identified in "Die Wandlung" were still in common usage. By the time the third edition appeared this "dictionary" had stretched to 33 "definitions".
