= Robbie Duff Scott =

English painter

Robbie Duff-Scott
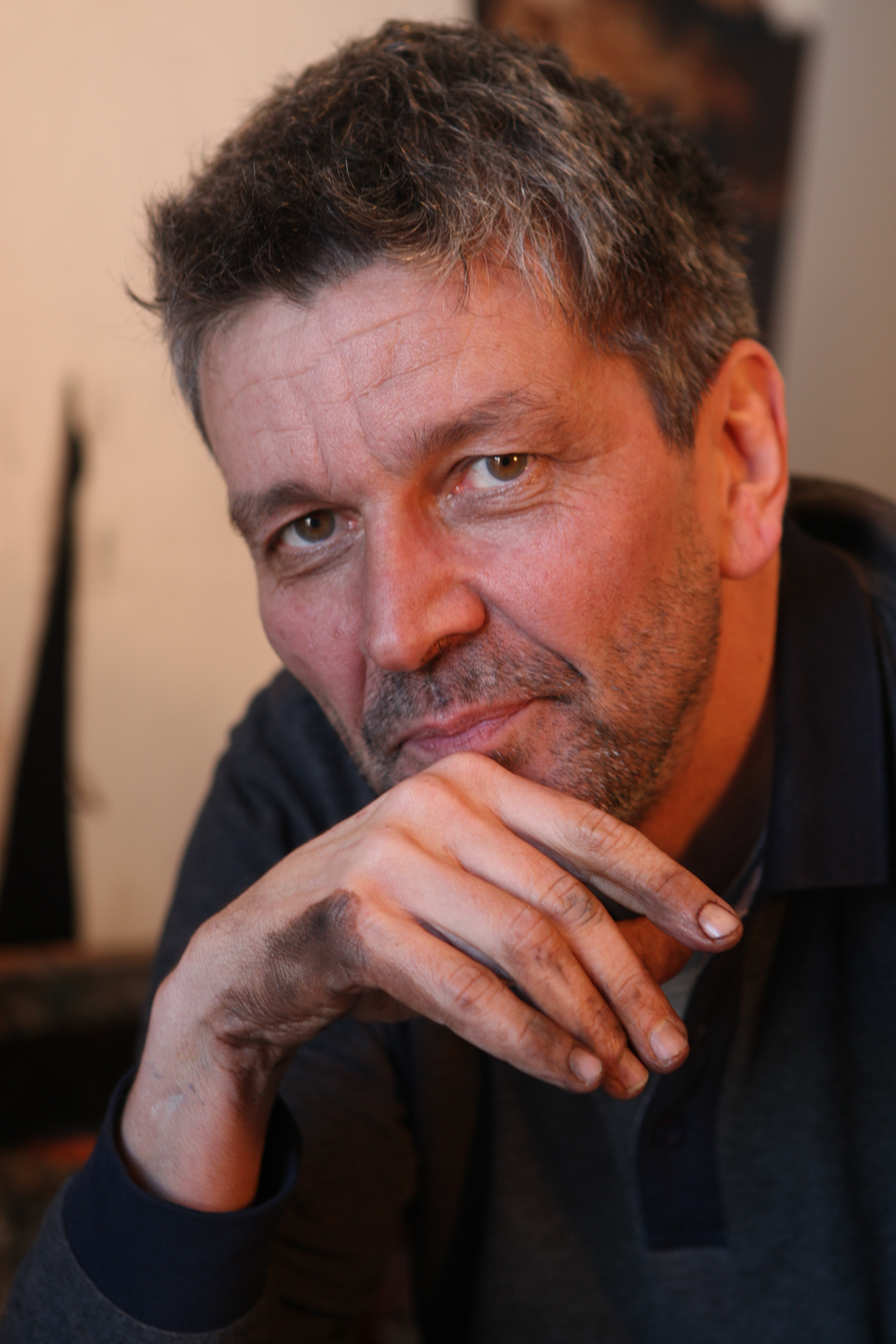
- Born: 1 July 1959; Bristol, England
- Died: 27 December 2016 (aged 57); Italy
- Education: University of York
- Known for: Oil painting
- Notable work: Francis Kyle Collection
- Awards: Royal West of England Academy

Robbie Duff-Scott (1959–2016) was a self-taught British oil painter, born in Bristol.

When he was twenty-three, he exhibited a self portrait at the National Portrait Gallery in London.

In 1985 he was a prize winner at the Royal West of England Academy in Bristol.

His work has been described by The Independent as:

Stuffed, late-Victorian style, with symbolic properties: images of fading youth, broken glass, spent matches, images of absence and restlessness, patterns in the dust where there was once a picture or a key, abandoned fruit, images of weather and forest and sea creeping into the brittle urban lives of his traumatised dames.

He was the third husband of author Lisa St Aubin de Terán and from the mid 1980s they lived in various parts of Italy, settling eventually in Umbria where their daughter Florence was born.

== Early life and work ==
Robbie Duff-Scott was born Robbie Charles Scott in Bristol on 1 July 1959. He was the only child of Barbara and Fred Scott, and entered John McKeown's North Town, Clifton College in 1972.

Derek Winterbottom, Head of History at Clifton College (1980–1994), refers to Duff-Scott during his time at Clifton as being "skilled at selective sports, collecting school colours in hockey and golf. He also showed that he had a considerable talent for drawing."

Duff-Scott moved on to The University of York where he read English, French and American literature, graduating in 1980.

Fascinated by the techniques used by the Renaissance masters, after leaving university he began to teach himself to paint, 'via manuals on restoration and forgery'. Duff-Scott soon realised something which the English poet Charles Tomlinson had observed: ‘You write with a pencil, but once you come to draw with it, what a diverse end those marks serve.’

In 1982 he received a letter from the poet George MacBeth, who had seen a painting of Duff-Scott's at The National Portrait Gallery (Self portrait on a chaise-longue). MacBeth wrote asking him if he would paint a portrait of his wife, the novelist Lisa St Aubin de Terán, whom Duff-Scott eventually married.

He moved to Italy in 1984, establishing a reputation there in his lifetime as an important proponent of the tradition of European figurative painting.

In 1989 Duff-Scott's father died of cancer. Years later, he would recount the experience, remembering: " the first thing I became aware of afterwards was a butterfly. So in my mind I tend to associate those two things, death and flight, or rather a want for the air.”

The obscure desire for flight and the inevitability of falling, are recurring themes in Duff-Scott's paintings, and become ever more present in his work from the 90's onwards.

In 1991 Clare Henry described the more recent works which Duff-Scott exhibited at Artbank in Glasgow as "technically less tight, temperamentally less melodramatic, allowing the subject to breathe. Compositions are ambitious yet rigorous", adding that "It takes courage to leave space within a picture, be it a bare wall, or an ambiguity of emotion."

== Family ==
He was the third husband of author, Lisa St Aubin de Terán and from the mid 1980s they lived in various parts of Italy, settling eventually in Umbria. Duff-Scott features prominently in his former wife's autobiographical work, ′′A Valley in Italy: Confessions of a House Addict′′, describing her experience of restoring their dilapidated palazzo, deep in the Umbrian hills.

Their daughter Florence Duff-Scott was born in Città di Castello, in 1990.

== Later life and work ==
As his confidence grew Duff-Scott relied less on technique alone. He exhibited his work for a second time at Artbank, in 1992 where "his new oils incorporate portraiture while expanding the ambiguity of his mysterious stage set scenarios."

In 2000 and again in 2002, Duff-Scott exhibited in London with the Francis Kyle Gallery. In 2008 he held the first of two shows at the Eakin Gallery, Belfast.

A solo show in 2009 at Palazzo dei Normanni featured (among many new paintings), examples of Duff-Scott's ’Evidence’ series. These ‘mysterious stage set scenarios’ were inspired by New York police photographs of homicides (1910–20), collected in Lucy Sante's 1992 publication, 'Evidence'. Duff-Scott recreated the ’still life' scenes assembled by those NYC police photographers in oils, removing the body to suggest that the ‘absence of evidence is not evidence of absence’. Serenella di Marco writes about the 'gothic element' which characterises these paintings. She observes that "the ‘macabre’ appearance is always subordinated to the emotional participation of the viewer; compelled into following Duff-Scott's narrative charm."

In the summer of 2014 he exhibited "The whale that swallowed the moon", a solo show of more than fifty works at Rocca of Umbertide, Italy. The title of the show took inspiration from J. B. Lenoir's 1965 blues song 'The whale has swallowed me', It was Duff-Scott's last exhibition during his lifetime.

== Death ==
He received an early diagnosis of multiple system atrophy, and by the end of 2015, was no longer able to paint. He died (of a stroke caused by his condition) in his studio apartment in Italy, on 27 December 2016. He is buried in Umbertide, Italy.
