= Grenoville =

Grenoville was a luxury perfume and cosmetics house established by the French perfumer Paul Grenoville in 1879.

== History ==
=== A perfumers duo ===
In 1879, the maître parfumeur Paul Grenouille changed his family name into ‘Grenoville’ when he founded his perfume house at 64, rue Rodier in Paris. His name might have inspired that of Jean-Baptiste Grenouille, who is the main character of Patrick Süskind’s novel Perfume (1985).

Paul Grenoville’s wife, Marie-Marthe Richard, took over the company after her husband died in 1900. Bluet was her first perfume, Rosier du Roy her second. In 1902, she moved Grenoville to new premises at 19, rue Royale, where the house kept a boutique shop until 1971.

In the early 1920s, she established Grenoville’s headquarters and factories at 108-110, Boulevard Péreire in Asnières. Female workers at the Grenoville house were nicknamed the "Grenovillettes".

In June 1924, Marie-Marthe Richard sold the house of Grenoville, as well as its factories, to the Parfise company.

=== The Parfise era ===
The Grenoville house was awarded a silver medal at the International Exhibition of Modern Decorative and Industrial Arts in 1925. The report on French perfumery at the Exhibition indicated that Grenoville’s perfumes had "gained the favour of elegant women".

The Grenoville house developed in the interwar years and branched out in Brussels, New York, London, and Milan. Grenoville’s perfumes were also distributed in Morocco, Tunisia, and Algeria, where they were advertised as "the best, the most tenacious and the finest".

The Grenoville house closed doors in the early 1970s.

== Perfumes and beauty products ==
=== Perfumes ===
In about a century of activity, the Grenoville house created many perfumes, among which the most famous were:

- Ambre hindou
- Avant l’été
- Byzance
- Bluet
- Casanova
- Chaîne d’or
- Cypria
- Dans un jardin
- Muguet d’Orly
- Oeillet fané
- Piège
- Prince noir
- Rosier du roy
- Victrix
- Violette Grenoville

Grenoville’s perfumes were sold in luxury bottles, some of which were made in Baccarat cristal. The bottle of Victrix was even designed by the French glassmaker René Lalique.

=== Cosmetics and beauty products ===
This perfume house also sold beauty products, including a lipstick line called "Sûre d’Elle" (self-confident), and a range of face powders called "Neo Derma" that offered sun and cold protection, as well as balms, talc, brillantine, and shampoos.

=== Advertising ===
Grenoville advertised its products in theatre programmes, illustrated newspapers, and, more importantly, in fashion magazines, including Vogue Paris and Vogue US.

The Grenoville house was also famous for its innovative shop windows. In 1927, Grenoville showed its perfumes at the Hairdressing Fair in a display decorated with an immense vial of perfume, which supported many small vials of identical shape. This stunning display was remarked by Vendre magazine, which specialized in the modern "art of selling".

== See also ==
- Guerlain
- Houbigant Parfum
- Parfums Lubin
