= On Love and Death =

Essay by Patrick Süskind

- First edition
- Author: Patrick Süskind
- Language: German
- Genre: Non-fiction
- Publisher: Diogenes

On Love and Death is an essay written by Patrick Süskind concerning the connection between "the two elemental forces of human existence."

== Summary ==
Süskind begins by describing differing views of love, and then elaborates using a combination of personal anecdotes, brief biographies of historical figures such as Heinrich von Kleist, and mythological stories of love. The first example involves Süskind bearing witness to a couple having oral sex during a traffic jam. The second example centers around a dinner party attended by Süskind, during which a couple fawn over each other and ignore the rest of the dinner guests. The third example is an account of the German writer Thomas Mann and his infatuation with a young waiter named Franzl. Süskind then analyzes these examples in terms of Plato's philosophy. The first example is used to illustrate "animal love", the second used to illustrate "delusion" or "frenzy", and the third used to illustrate ideal, "Platonic love."

Süskind then proceeds to relate love and death. Kleist and Goethe occupy this section of the essays. Both Kleist and Goethe harbored suicidal thoughts stemming from their respective love lives. Süskind uses these stories as well as brief references to Richard Wagner's Tristan und Isolde to illustrate a central theme of the essays: an "erotic longing for death."

The final section of the essays is devoted to a comparison of two mythological accounts of love: the stories of Orpheus and Jesus Christ. Süskind likens the two figures to each other in that both ventured into the realm of death because of their love; however, Süskind is critical of Jesus for his almost political motives and his "distance and inhumanity", in the sense that he was completely immune to the frenzy of love. He praises Orpheus for his courage and selflessness. While Jesus could count on divine assistance, asserts Süskind, Orpheus ventured into Hades with only his prodigious skill as a musician and his desire to reclaim his beloved Eurydice. In addition, Süskind states that the story of Orpheus is more moving to readers because it is a story of failure. Whereas Jesus is "only a god", Orpheus is "a more complete human being."

== Works referenced in the essays ==
- Phaedo
- Symposium
- Die Zauberflöte
- Amphitryon
- The Sorrows of Young Werther
- Anna Karenina
- Madame Bovary
- Effi Briest
- The Hour of our Death
- Hymns to Night
- Fleurs du Mal
- Vollendung/Selige Sehnsucht
- Das Tagebuch
- Tristan und Isolde
