= The Cambridge Quintet =

Book by John Casti

- Author: John L. Casti
- Language: English
- Genre: Novel
- Publisher: Helix Books/Addison-Wesley
- Publication date: 1998

The Cambridge Quintet is a book written by John L. Casti and published by Helix Books/Addison Wesley in 1998.

== Synopsis ==
The book describes a fictitious dinner party hosted by C. P. Snow at a Cambridge University college in 1949. During the dinner party Snow and his guests discuss the limits of machines trying to simulate human thinking. Snow's guests are Ludwig Wittgenstein, Erwin Schrödinger, J. B. S. Haldane and Alan Turing.
