= Come Deadly =

1974 American pornographic horror film

- DVD released by After Hours Cinema
- Directed by: Gil Kenston
- Written by: Gil Kenston
- Starring: Kirt Jones; Nina Fause; Peter Puluva; Hoss Slocum; Keith Erickson; Cindy Johnson; Maggie Williams
- Music by: Bill Thomas
- Production company: Scorpio Producing Company
- Release date: 1974 (United States)
- Running time: 60 minutes
- Country: United States
- Language: English

Come Deadly is a 1974 pornographic horror film written and directed by Gil Kenston.

== Plot ==
A man wearing a wide-brimmed hat, white gloves, and a stocking over his face rapes a woman, then smothers her. Two weeks later, as her cast mates are rehearsing for William Shakespeare's The Taming of the Shrew, Ann is raped and strangled by the same man in the loft above the theatre. Thinking the killer could strike this particular theatre again, Detective Winston Rains goes undercover as the play's leading man in an effort to catch him.

Rains walks Julie home after rehearsal, and the two have sex in her living room. Julie kicks Rains out after finding his gun, which makes her realize he is an undercover officer, and that everything he had told her up until that point was a lie. As soon as Rains leaves, the murderer breaks into Julie's house, rapes and chokes her, and leaves her for dead. The next day, Julie approaches Rains in the theatre, and tells him to meet with her a few blocks away in fifteen minutes.

Andy, the play's director, appears to a waiting Julie, and informs her that Rains will not be able to meet with her. A despondent Julie is followed home by the murderer, who sexually assaults and asphyxiates her while Rains has sex with Marie, another actress, back at the theatre. Rains tells Marie that he is a detective, and asks if she can help him with a plan he has concocted to flush out the killer.

Marie goes up the loft and masturbates, and when the killer attacks her, Rains ambushes him, but is knocked out. Rains regains consciousness while Marie is being raped by the killer, who makes a run for it. Rains catches the killer, who is revealed to be Andy. When questioned about his motives, Andy breaks down, implies his mother molested him as a child, and claims that he did not mean to kill his victims, and that he assaulted them due to his own feelings of inadequacy.

Andy is arrested, and Rains and Marie celebrate his capture by going to Marie's house, and having sex. As the two make love, someone wearing a disguise identical to Andy's is shown on the prowl.

== Cast ==
- Kirt Jones as Detective Winston Rains
- Cindy Johnson as Julie
- Keith Erickson as Cliff Barnett
- Nina Fause as Marie
- Maggie Williams as Ann Johnson
- Peter Puluva as Andy Andrews
- Hoss Slocum as Martin

== Reception ==
AV Maniacs wrote "awkwardly overacted from start to finish, this creaky murder mystery isn't exactly an edge of your seat thriller, but it is a fun little movie" and if you dig that bad acting, awkward cinematography, wonky wardrobe, and generally enjoyable ineptitude that seventies smut tends to offer en masse, you should have a good time with it. It's goofy, but it's a reasonably entertaining smut film". A two out of ten was awarded by The Movies Made Me Do It, which stated that Come Deadly was an unintentionally comical exercise in ineptitude, with terrible editing and acting, and a lame mystery.

== DVD release ==
Come Deadly was released on DVD in 2008 by After Hours Cinema, in a double feature with fellow "roughie" Wet Wilderness.

== See also ==
- List of American films of 1974
