= Der Kontrabaß =

Play by Patrick Süskind

- Original language: German
- Written by: Patrick Süskind
- Characters: The double bassist
- Genre: One-act monologue

Premiere
- Date: 22 September 1981
- Place: Cuvilliés Theatre, Munich

Der Kontrabaß
- Translator: Michael Hofmann
- Published: 1984 (Diogenes Verlag; German); 1987 (Hamish Hamilton; English)
- Awards: Schlegel-Tieck Prize for translation
- ISBN: 978-3-257-01658-1 (German); 024112039X (English)

Der Kontrabaß (The Double Bass) is a play by Patrick Süskind. The monologue in one act premiered in 1981.

== History ==
The manuscript of the play by Patrick Süskind dates back to 1980. The monologue in one act, the author's first work for the stage, premiered at the Cuvilliés Theatre in Munich on 22 September 1981 and was performed by Nikolaus Paryla, who also directed. Thanks to its minimal staging requirements, the play was successfully reproduced at most German-language theatres. In the 1984–85 season, it was the play with the most performances on German language stages, playing more than 500 times.

Printed in 1984 by the Diogenes Verlag, the play was translated into English by Michael Hofmann and published in 1987 by Hamish Hamilton. This translation was awarded the Schlegel-Tieck Prize in 1988. The play also appeared in the Bloomsbury Classics series. It has been translated into 28 languages, including Arabic, French, Russian, Serbian, Spanish, Turkish, and Persian.

== Synopsis ==
The play consists of an extended monologue delivered by a double bass player, who speaks to the audience in his small sound-proofed apartment while drinking beer. He is in his mid-thirties and is employed at a State Orchestra. At first he praises his instrument and its importance in the orchestra by telling anecdotes about its history and by actually playing it. With a considerable humour, he reveals more and more of his past and present rather than his current misery. He did not pick his instrument out of love and he never has company. He reveals too that once when his car broke down and stranded him and his instrument in the cold, he gave his coat to the bass, thereby adding to the image of a lonely man who realises that his performance is mediocre:

Können Sie mir sagen, wieso ein Mann Mitte Dreißig, nämlich ich, mit einem Instrument zusammenlebt, das ihn permanent behindert?! Menschlich, gesellschaftlich, verkehrstechnisch, sexuell und musikalisch nur behindert?!

Tell me if you can why a grown man in his mid-thirties, namely me, should have to live with an instrument that's a constant handicap to him?! Humanly, socially, sexually, musically, in traffic – nothing but a handicap!

The player dreams of chamber music, especially Schubert's Trout Quintet. He also dreams of approaching a young mezzo-soprano, Sarah, but fails to impress her by playing "eklatant schön" (strikingly beautifully). He imagines to win her attention by yelling her name at the festival premiere of Das Rheingold in the silence full of expectation before the soft beginning. When he leaves for the performance in concert dress, the end is open.

== Music examples ==
The narration is accompanied by extracts from the following pieces:

- Johannes Brahms: Symphony No. 2
- Richard Wagner: prelude to Die Walküre
- Carl Ditters von Dittersdorf: Double bass concerto No. 2 in E major
- Wolfgang Amadeus Mozart: Overture of Le nozze di Figaro
- Wolfgang Amadeus Mozart: È amore un ladroncello, Aria of Dorabella from Così fan tutte
- Franz Schubert: Trout Quintet

== Performance ==
Many actors have performed the one-man show successfully. Walter Renneisen has played the piece for more than 30 years, admitting that he is too old for the character, but still working on new nuances. Odekhiren Amaize, bass-baritone, performed the play at the Courtyard Playhouse in Al Quoz, Dubai.

== Audio play ==
- WDR with Walter Schmidinger, 1981, Der HÖR Verlag, DHV (1995), ISBN 978-3-89584-129-3
