= Keepers of the House =

1982 debut novel of Lisa St Aubin de Terán

- First edition
- Author: Lisa St Aubin de Terán
- Cover artist: Jenny Tylden-Wright
- Language: English
- Publisher: Jonathan Cape (UK); Harper & Row (US)
- Publication date: 1982
- Publication place: United Kingdom
- Media type: Print
- Pages: 192
- ISBN: 0-224-02001-3

Keepers of the House is the debut novel of Lisa St Aubin de Terán, published as The Long Way Home in the US. The novel is autobiographical and set in a Venezuelan valley beset by drought. First published in 1982 by Jonathan Cape in London, it won the 1983 Somerset Maugham Award.

== Plot introduction ==
The story concerns Lydia an Englishwoman who has married Diego, the second to last survivor of the Beltrán family. They return to La Bebella, a dilapidated mansion on a neglected estate upon which years of drought and disease have taken their toll. Only Benito, her husband's retainer, remains and when her husband becomes depressed and a virtual recluse, Lydia has to take on the management of the estate with its sparse avocado and sugar cane crops. Benito recounts to her the history of the family and its gradual decline and it is this history and the characters concerned which forms the bulk of the narrative.
