= John Casti =

American mathematician (born 1943)

John L. Casti
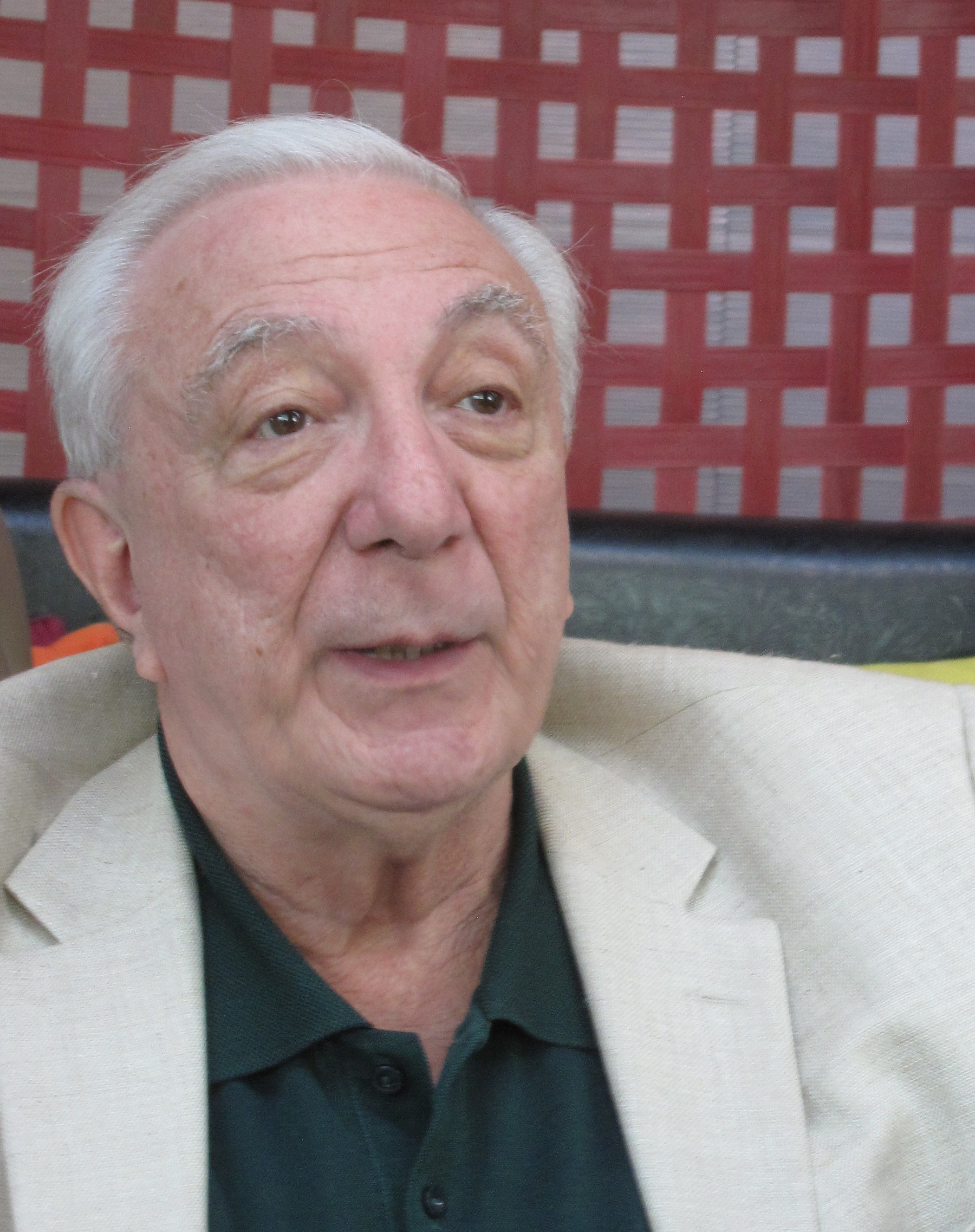
- John Casti in September 2014
- Born: 1943 (age 82–83); Oregon, U.S.
- Education: University of Southern California (Ph.D.)
- Awards: Association of American Publishers
- Scientific career
- Fields: Mathematics Scientific Modeling and Prediction; Computer Simulation; Social "mood" effects on future trends and events Extreme events in Human Society
- Workplaces: X-Events Dynamics LLC (Co-Founder) X-Center (founder ) Center for Complex Systems and Enterprises at the Stevens Institute of Technology (Senior Research Fellow); Qforma – (Co-founder); SimWorld – (Co-founder); Santa Fe Institute – (External Faculty); International Institute for Applied Systems Analysis (IIASA) – (Senior Research Fellow); Technical University of Vienna - (Professor of Operations Research and System Theory); Princeton University – (Faculty); New York University – (Faculty); University of Arizona – (Faculty) Rand Corporation – (Researcher)

John L. Casti (born 1943) is an author, complexity scientist, systems theorist, mathematician and entrepreneur.

== As an author ==
Casti has written more than 120 scientific articles, seven technical monographs and textbooks on mathematical modeling. He was also the former editor of the journals Applied Mathematics & Computation and Complexity.

Casti has written 14 popular books on science. These include Paradigms Lost: Images of Man in the Mirror of Science, which addresses several of the most puzzling controversies in modern science; Searching for Certainty: What Scientists Can Know About the Future, a volume dealing with problems of scientific prediction and explanation of everyday events like the weather, stock market price movements and the outbreak of warfare; and Complexification, a study of complex systems and the manner in which they give rise to counterintuitive, surprising behavior. In addition, he published Would-Be Worlds in 1996, a volume on computer simulation and the way it promises to change the way scientific exploration is conducted.

Meanwhile, Dr. Casti has also written three volumes on mathematics: Five Golden Rules: Great Theories of 20th-Century Mathematics and Why They Matter, a sequel, Five More Golden Rules, and Mathematical Mountaintops: The Five Most Famous Problems of All Time, published and later recalled by Oxford University Press. In 1992, he published Reality Rules, a two-volume text on mathematical modeling. In 1989, his written work Alternate Realities: Mathematical Models of Nature and Man was awarded a prize by the Association of American Publishers in a competition among scholarly books published in mathematics and the natural sciences.

In recent years, Casti has shifted his literary focus to science fiction. In 1998 he published The Cambridge Quintet, a volume of scientific fiction involving Ludwig Wittgenstein, Alan Turing, J. B. S. Haldane, C. P. Snow and Erwin Schrödinger in a fictional dinner-party conversation centered about the question of the uniqueness of human cognition and the possibility of thinking machines. More recently, his published books include Art & Complexity, a volume edited with A. Karlqvist, as well as a short volume on the life of Kurt Gödel published in 2003 titled Gödel: A Life of Logic. In the same year he published the volume, The One, True, Platonic Heaven, which addresses in a fictional format the question of the limits to scientific knowledge. The volume on art and complexity sparked off a continuing interest in the interrelationship between complex systems and artistic forms of all types, which is reflected in a set of papers currently in preparation addressing the complexity of scientific theories regarded as artistic forms.

In other literary pursuits, he published a neo-noir thriller entitled Prey for Me in 2020.

=== Plagiarism ===
In 2002, Casti's newest book, Mathematical Mountaintops, was recalled by Oxford University Press due to "rampant plagiarism". According to the New York Times, in the book, Casti had "lifted" passages and images from mathematicians and writers such as Thomas Callister Hales, William Dunham, Barry Arthur Cipra, and Simon Singh.

In another incident two years later, Casti retracted one of his articles, "Losing games for your winning play", that had been published in the journal Complexity. In the retraction notice, Casti admitted that it had been "... plagiarized in its entirety from the article by Erica Klarreich, 'Playing Both Sides' in the January/February issue of The Sciences." Casti apologized to Klarreich, as well as to Paul Davies, for plagiarizing their work.

== Mathematician ==
As a mathematician and researcher, Casti received his bachelor's degree from Portland State University and his Ph.D. under Richard Bellman at the University of Southern California. He worked at the RAND Corporation in Santa Monica, California, and served on the faculties of the University of Arizona, New York University and Princeton University, before moving to Vienna in 1973 to become one of the first members of the research staff at the International Institute for Applied Systems Analysis (IIASA) in Laxenburg, Austria. In 1986, he left IIASA to take up a position as a professor of operations research and system theory at the Technical University of Vienna. He also served as a member of the External Faculty of the Santa Fe Institute in Santa Fe, New Mexico, USA, from 1992 to 2002, where he worked extensively on the application of biological metaphors to the mathematical modeling of problems in economics, finance and road-traffic networks, as well as on large-scale computer simulations for the study of such networks.

His primary research interests have shifted somewhat in recent years from the natural sciences to the exploration of questions in the social and behavioral realm. One thread has been exploration of the relationship between the social "mood" of a population and its biasing effect on actions and behaviors. In this direction, his 2010 book, Mood Matters: From Rising Skirt Lengths to the Collapse of World Powers, addresses the directions and patterns of social causation and their implications for future trends and collective social events, such as styles in popular culture, the outcome of political processes, and even the rise and fall of civilizations. His most recent book is X-EVENTS: The Collapse of Everything, which addresses the underlying cause of extreme events generated by human inattention, misunderstanding, error, stupidity, or malevolent intent.

== Entrepreneur ==
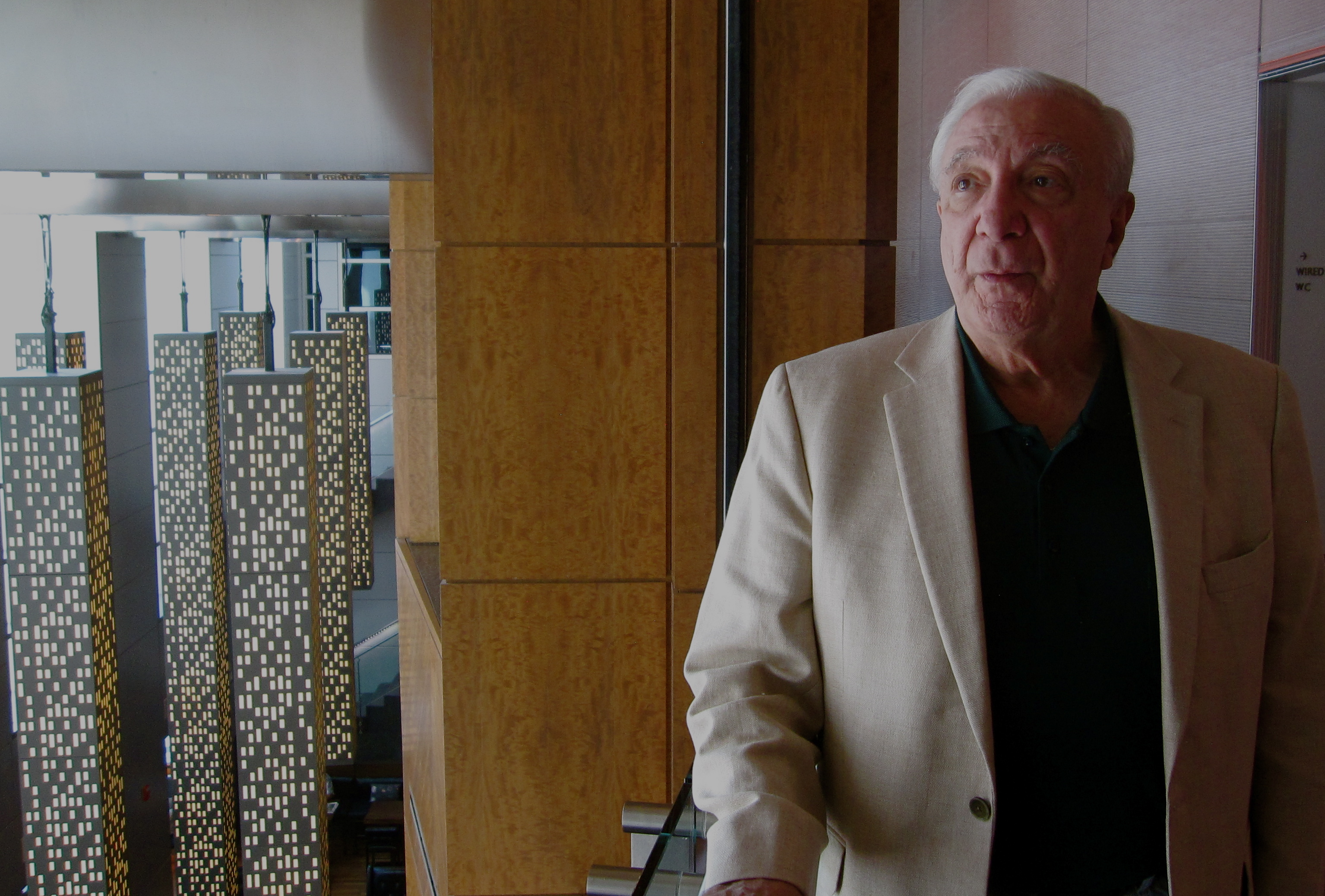
Stevens Institute of Technology, Hoboken, NJ

Casti formed two companies in Santa Fe and London in 2000, Qforma, Inc. and SimWorld, Ltd, respectively, devoted to the employment of tools and concepts from modern system theory for the solution of problems in business and finance, as well as health care. Qforma merged with SkilaMederi in June 2013. In early 2005 he returned to Vienna, where he co-founded The Kenos Circle, a professional society that aims to make use of complexity science in order to gain a deeper insight into the future than that offered by more conventional statistical tools.

For several years, Professor Casti was a Senior Research Scholar at the International Institute for Applied Systems Analysis in Laxenburg, Austria, where he created an initiative for the study on Extreme Events in Human Society. In January 2012, he left IIASA to form a new research institute in Vienna, The X-Center, devoted to the study of human-caused extreme events. The X-Center has now expanded to a network of affiliated X-Centers in Helsinki, Tokyo, Seoul, New York and Singapore. Since early 2013, Dr. Casti has been serving as a senior research fellow at the Center for Complex Systems and Enterprises at the Stevens Institute of Technology in the USA. Casti co-founded X-Events Dynamics LLC in 2017 to focus on extreme events in business and government.

== Bibliography ==
- Casti, John; Robert E. Kalaba (1973). Imbedding Methods in Applied Mathematics. Reading, MA: Addison-Wesley.
- Casti, John (1977). Dynamical Systems and their Applications: Linear Theory. New York: Academic Press.
- Casti, John; Robert E. Larson (1978). Principles of Dynamic Programming–Part I. New York: Marcel Dekker.
- Casti, John; Robert E. Larson (1982). Principles of Dynamic Programming–Part II. New York: Marcel Dekker.
- Casti, John (1979). Connectivity, Complexity and Catastrophe in Large-Scale Systems. Chichester, UK: John Wiley & Sons.
- Casti, John (1985). Nonlinear System Theory. New York: Academic Press.
- Casti, John (1987). Linear Dynamical Systems. New York: Academic Press.
- Casti, John (1989). Alternate Realities: Mathematical Models of Nature and Man. New York: John Wiley & Sons.
- Casti, John (1989). Paradigms Lost: Images of Man in the Mirror of Science. New York: William Morrow & Co. ISBN 9780688081317.
- Casti, John (1991). Searching for Certainty: What Scientists Can Know About the Future. New York: William Morrow & Co. ISBN 9780688089801.
- Casti, John (1992). Reality Rules-I: Picturing the World in Mathematics-The Fundamentals. New York: Wiley.
- Casti, John (1992). Reality Rules-II: Picturing the World in Mathematics-The Frontier. New York: Wiley.
- Casti, John (1994). Complexification: Explaining a Paradoxical World Through the Science of Surprise. New York: HarperCollins. ISBN 9780060168889.
- Casti, John (1996). Five Golden Rules: Great Theories of 20th-Century Mathematics-and Why They Matter. New York: John Wiley & Sons. ISBN 9780471002611.
- Casti, John (1997). Would-Be Worlds: How Simulation is Changing the Face of Science. New York: John Wiley & Sons. ISBN 9780471123088.
- Casti, John (1998). The Cambridge Quintet: A Work of Scientific Speculation. London: Little, Brown, Ltd.
- Casti, John (2000). Paradigms Regained. New York: William Morrow & Co. ISBN 9780688161156.
- Casti, John (2000). Five More Golden Rules. New York: John Wiley & Sons.
- Casti, John (2000). Goedel: A Life of Logic. Cambridge, MA: Perseus Books.
- Casti, John (2001). Mathematical Mountaintops: The Five Most Famous Problems of All Time. New York: Oxford University Press. ISBN 978-0-19-514171-9. (Withdrawn for plagiarism, 2002.)
- Casti, John (2003). The One, True, Platonic Heaven: A Scientific Fiction. Washington, DC: Joseph Henry Press.
- Casti, John (2010). Mood Matters: From Rising Skirt Lengths to the Collapse of World Powers. New York: Copernicus Books.
- Casti, John (2012). X-Events: Complexity Overload and the Collapse of Everything. New York: HarperCollins.
- Casti, John (2020). Prey for Me. Vienna: TheX-Press.
