= Manov =

Manov (Cyrillic: Манов) is a Slavic masculine surname, its feminine counterpart is Manova (Манова). It may refer to:

- Paulina Manov (born 1975), Serbian actress
- Todor Manov (born 1969), Bulgarian wrestler
