= Wet Wilderness =

- Directed by: Lee Cooper
- Produced by: Robert Thomas
- Starring: Faye Little; Alicia Hammer; Raymond North; Daymon Gerard
- Cinematography: Alan Jolson
- Edited by: Robert Thomas
- Music by: Melvin Devil
- Release dates: January 11, 1976 (Waterloo, Iowa)
- Running time: 54 minutes
- Country: United States
- Language: English

Wet Wilderness is a 1976 pornographic horror film directed by Lee Cooper and starring Faye Little, Alicia Hammer, Raymond North, and Daymon Gerard. It was produced by Robert Thomas.

== Plot ==
A mother, her son and daughter, and the daughter's girlfriend are out in the woods on a camping trip. While the mother and son head to a cabin, the daughter and her girlfriend go to a clearing, where they have sex. While the two women fornicate, they are happened upon by a machete-wielding man in an orange balaclava, who forces the two to perform various sexual acts on him, and each other. While her girlfriend is fellating the masked man, the daughter flees, with the man giving chase after he stabs the girlfriend in the crotch with his machete.

The man follows the daughter to the rest of the family, sexually abuses the mother, and forces the daughter to perform oral sex on her brother. After he sodomizes the mother, the man has her and her son copulate, and while he is distracted watching the two, the daughter makes a run for it. While stumbling through the woods, the daughter finds a man bound to a tree, and unties him after he says the masked man had captured him three days ago. Just as the daughter unleashes the man, the rapist (who has killed the son offscreen) appears with the mother in tow. The rapist makes the man, the daughter, and the mother have a threesome, then murders the man by striking him in the chest with an axe.

After he has the mother and daughter clean the dead man's blood off themselves, the rapist forces the two to perform oral sex on him. As her mother fellates the man, the daughter grabs his discarded machete, and castrates him with it (off screen).

== Cast ==
- Daymon Gerard
- Alicia Hammer
- Raymond North
- Faye Little

== Reception ==
Wet Wilderness was called "reprehensible in pretty much every possible way" by AV Maniacs, which also said the film's potentially offensive content was dulled by how inept and poorly acted it was. A score of seven out of ten was awarded by The Movies Made Me Do It, which concluded that Wet Wilderness was "not a masterpiece and it's not a perfect film even by the low standards of the genre, but it is an entertaining little flick that fans of this sort of trash will certainly enjoy".

== DVD release ==
Wet Wilderness was released on DVD in 2008 by After Hours Cinema, in a double feature with fellow "roughie" Come Deadly. The film was redubbed and given a new score for this release, as the original version made illegal use of music taken from both Psycho and Jaws.
