= Lisa St Aubin de Terán =

English writer (born 1953)

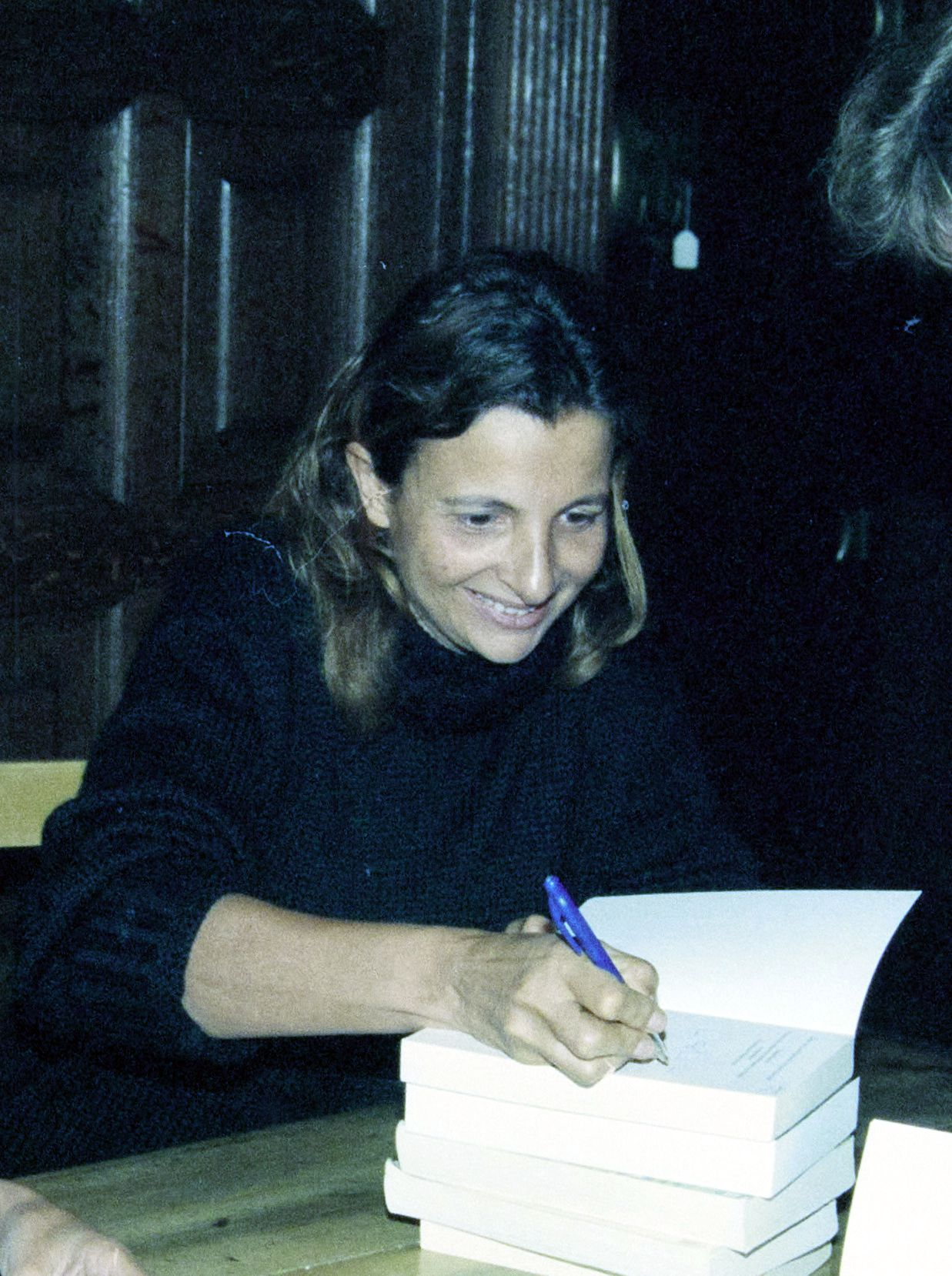
- Saint Aubin de Terán in Haarlem, 1999
- Born: 2 October 1953 (age 72)
- Education: James Allen's Girls' School
- Occupation: Novelist
- Spouse(s): Jaime Terán; George MacBeth; Robbie Duff Scott
- Children: Iseult (with Jaime Terán); Alexander (with George MacBeth); Florence (with Robbie Duff Scott)
- Relatives: Jan Carew (father)
- Writing career
- Genres: Novels, Autobiographical fiction
- Notable works: Keepers of the House; The Slow Train to Milan
- Notable awards: Somerset Maugham Award; John Llewellyn Rhys Prize

Lisa St Aubin de Terán (born 2 October 1953) is an English novelist, writer of autobiographical fictions, and memoirist. Her father was the Guyanese writer and academic Jan Carew.

== Life and career ==
Lisa St Aubin de Terán was born in 1953 to Joan Mary Murray (née St Aubin) and Jan Rynveld Carew and was brought up in Clapham in south London. She attended James Allen's Girls' School. Her memoir Hacienda (1998) describes how she fell into a whirlwind first marriage at the age of 16 to an exiled Venezuelan aristocrat and bank robber, Jaime Terán, and lived for seven years at a remote farm in the Andean region of Venezuela. She fled both the marriage and Venezuela when he suggested that she and their infant daughter should join him in a suicide pact.

After returning to Britain, she married her second husband, the Scottish poet and novelist George MacBeth in 1982. It was also in that year she published her first novel, Keepers of the House, winning her the Somerset Maugham Award and a place on Granta's list of "Best of Young British Novelists" (1983, issue #7). The Slow Train to Milan, winner of the John Llewellyn Rhys Prize, followed in 1983. In the same year, she moved to Wiggenhall St. Mary Magdalen in Norfolk. After her second marriage broke down, she left to live in Italy.

Her third husband was the painter Robbie Duff Scott, whom she had first met when George MacBeth asked him to paint a portrait of her. After marrying in 1989, she and Duff Scott moved to Umbria, her life there being described in Venice: The Four Seasons (1992) and A Valley in Italy (1994).

In 1994, she presented "Santos to Santa Cruz", an episode of the BBC television series Great Railway Journeys, about travelling from Brazil to Bolivia, and wrote an accompanying article for The Times. Later in 1998, she visited Lake Garda and Lake Maggiore for an episode of the BBC Radio 4 documentary The Off Season.

In 2001, Duff Scott and de Terán separated and by 2003 de Terán had moved to Amsterdam and set up her own film production company called Radiant Pictures, through which she met her new partner, Dutch cameraman, Mees van Deth. A year later, the couple moved to Mossuril, Nampula Province, Mozambique.

De Terán has three children.

== The Terán Foundation ==
In 2004, Lisa St Aubin de Terán established The Terán Foundation to help poor villages in northern Mozambique. She writes about this phase of her life in Mozambique Mysteries (2007).

The Terán Foundation's first project, the College of Tourism and Agriculture (CTCA) in Cabaceira Grande, operated between 2004 and 2010, before it was sold back to the government. A second restaurant and guest house, Sunset Boulevard, functions on a non-profit basis as a training facility in Mossuril. The third building project, The Leopard Spot, was earmarked for construction in Milange, on the border with Malawi.

== Awards ==
Year	Work	Award	Result	Ref.
1982	Keepers of the House	Somerset Maugham Award	Won	
1983	Poetry	Eric Gregory Award	Won	
1983	The Slow Train to Milan	John Llewellyn Rhys Prize	Won	

== Bibliography ==
In addition to her books, Lisa St Aubin de Terán has written, primarily as a travel journalist, for The Observer, The Guardian, The Daily Telegraph, The Times, The Independent, The New York Times, The Mail on Sunday, New Statesman, Vanity Fair, Marie Claire and Cosmopolitan among other publications.

=== Books ===
Year	Title	Publisher	Genre	Notes
1980	The Streak	Martin Booth	Poem	Limited edition of 125 copies. (6 pp.)
1982	Keepers of the House	Jonathan Cape / Harper and Row	Novel	Published in the US with the title The Long Way Home). Winner of the Somerset Maugham Award
1983	The Slow Train to Milan	Jonathan Cape	Novel	Winner of the John Llewellyn Rhys Prize. Reviewed in The Sunday Times
1984	The Tiger	Jonathan Cape	Novel	Reviewed in The Times and The Sunday Times
1985	The High Place	Jonathan Cape	Poetry	
1986	"I hate the cinema"	The Irish Times	Short story	11 August 1986: p. 13
1986	The Bay of Silence	Jonathan Cape	Novel	
1987	Black Idol	Jonathan Cape	Novel	Reviewed in The Independent
1989	The Marble Mountain and other stories	Jonathan Cape	Short stories	Reviewed in The Sunday Telegraph
1989	Off the Rails: Memoirs of a Train Addict	Bloomsbury	Memoir	Reviewed in The Sunday Times, The Telegraph and The Independent
1989	Landscape in Italy	Pavilion	Pictorial	Photographs by John Ferro Sims
1989	Indiscreet Journeys: Stories of Women on the Road	Virago Press	Anthology	Editor
1990	Joanna	Virago Press	Novel	Reviewed in The Times, The Sunday Times, The Daily Telegraph, The Independent and The Independent on Sunday
1991	Venice: The Four Seasons	Pavilion	Travelogue	Photographs by Mick Lindberg
1992	Nocturne	Hamish Hamilton	Novel	Reviewed in The Sunday Times
1994	A Valley in Italy: Confessions of a House Addict	Hamish Hamilton / HarperCollins	Memoir	Published in the US as A Valley in Italy: The Many Seasons of a Villa in Umbria. Reviewed in The Independent on Sunday
1997	The Hacienda: My Venezuelan Years	Virago Press	Memoir	Reviewed in The Daily Telegraph and The Independent
1997	The Palace	Macmillan	Novel	Reviewed in The Sunday Times and The Independent
1998	Virago Book of Wanderlust and Dreams	Virago Press	Anthology	Editor
1999	Southpaw	Virago Press	Short stories	
2000	Elements of Italy	Virago Press	Anthology	Editor
2002	Memory Maps	Virago Press	Memoir	Reviewed in The Times
2005	Otto	Virago Press / Harper Perennial	Novel	Published in the US with the title Swallowing Stones. Reviewed in The Times, The Irish Times, The Guardian and The Independent
2007	Mozambique Mysteries	Virago Press	Memoir	Reviewed in The Independent
2024	Better Broken Than New	Amaurea Press	Memoir	https://www.amaureapress.com/titles/better-broken-than-new/
2024	The Hobby	Amaurea Press	Novel	https://www.amaureapress.com/titles/the-hobby/
