= The Pigeon (novella) =

1987 novella by German writer Patrick Süskind

- First edition cover
- Author: Patrick Süskind
- Original title: Die Taube
- Translator: John E. Woods
- Language: German
- Genre: Novella
- Publication date: 1987
- Publication place: Germany
- English publication date: June 29, 1989
- Pages: 77
- ISBN: 9780140105834

The Pigeon (German: Die Taube) is a 1987 novella by German writer Patrick Süskind. Taking place in a single day, the story follows a solitary Parisian bank security guard who undergoes an existential crisis when a pigeon roosts in front of his one-room apartment's door, prohibiting him entrance to his private sanctuary. The book was Süskind's follow-up to his nine-year bestselling first novel, Perfume and drew comparisons to the work of Franz Kafka and Edgar Allan Poe.

== Plot ==
Jonathan Noel is a tidy and solitary man: he is nearing retirement and has never failed at his job as a security guard at the bank near his home in Paris. He has only one aspiration: to live a quiet recluse life without being paid attention to. His youth, which was not the most pleasant, explains to a large extent this withdrawal: in 1942, his mother was deported to the Drancy concentration camp; in 1953, he went to war in Indochina and in 1954, his uncle persuaded him to marry Marie Baccouche, who was unfortunately already five months pregnant and in love with another man with whom she later fled.

He lives in a small maid's room on the top floor of a bourgeois house, sheltered from the world. He loves his simple room so much that he will soon buy it for himself so that nothing can separate them any more and he can end his life by continuing his daily routine. In a way, as the narrator says, his little room is 'his mistress, for she tenderly welcomes him into her'.

But one morning, when he goes out to relieve himself in the little toilet upstairs, after listening carefully to make sure he doesn't meet anyone, he comes face to face with a pigeon. Panic-stricken, he locks himself in his room. Only with a great burst of courage does he manage to get out of his room and go to work. He was determined to leave his room so that he would not have to see the pigeon again.

Throughout the day he fails to follow his usual routine and thinks he is finished. He commits a few blunders on his morning shift and unintentionally tears his trousers during his lunch break: these events, which are of no major importance, take on the dimension of a drama in his eyes. He goes so far as to envy the tramp he has been seeing every day for years, who seems at that moment to embody a model of carefreeness and freedom, far removed from his own anxieties. That evening he goes to sleep in a hotel with his savings so as not to have to see him again. He spends a tormented night, a storm provokes a reminiscence of his painful childhood memories. But the next day, when he decides to return home, he seems at peace. Just as he did the day he discovered his mother's disappearance in 1942, he enjoys walking through the puddles. The end of the story is thus linked to the evocation of his youth in the incipit. When he returns home, Jonathan is relieved to discover that the pigeon is gone and the hallway is clean.

== Characters ==
- Jonathan Noel – lost his parents during World War II and grew up with his uncle. He was married, but his wife abandoned him, and he decided to spend his life alone without drawing anyone's attention.
- Marie Baccouche – Jonathan's wife, she was already pregnant when she met him and later left him for a Tunisian fruit-dealer.
- Madame Lasalle – the owner of Jonathan's room. Eventually, she consents to sell him the room.
- Madame Rocard – a concierge of the house, which Jonathan lives in. He had never spoken to her before the incident with the pigeon occurred. Jonathan considers her too curious.
- Monsieur Vilman – the deputy director of the bank Jonathan works in.
- Madame Roques – a senior cashier of the bank.
- Monsieur Roedel – the director of the bank. Jonathan has to open the door of his limousine every day.

== Analysis ==
The titular pigeon can be a symbol for disorder intruding on the protagonist's meticulously organized existence, and may be seen as similar to Edgar Allan Poe's 1845 poem The Raven, which features its titular bird perched over its protagonist's door instead of Noel's pigeon.

== Adaptations ==
The novella was adapted for the stage in a play that premiered in May 1993 at the BAC Theatre in London.

== See also ==
- List of works set within one day
- The Raven
