= George MacBeth =

Scottish poet and novelist (1932–1992)

- Born: 19 January 1932; Shotts, Lanarkshire, Scotland
- Died: 16 February 1992 (aged 60); Tuam, County Galway, Ireland
- Education: King Edward VII School
- Alma mater: New College, Oxford
- Occupations: Poet and novelist
- Awards: Geoffrey Faber Memorial Prize

George Mann MacBeth (19 January 1932 – 16 February 1992) was a Scottish poet and novelist.

== Biography ==
George MacBeth was born in Shotts, Lanarkshire, Scotland. When he was three, his family moved to Sheffield in England. He was educated in Sheffield at King Edward VII School, where he was Head Prefect in 1951 (photo), before going up to New College, Oxford, with an Open Scholarship in Classics.

He joined BBC Radio on graduating in 1955 from the University of Oxford. He worked there, as a producer of programmes on poetry, notably for the BBC Third Programme, until 1976. He was a member of The Group.

He resigned from the BBC to take up novel-writing; he introduced a series of thrillers involving the spy, Cadbury.

In his later post-BBC years, after divorcing his first wife, he married the novelist Lisa St Aubin de Terán, with whom he had a child, Alexander Morton George MacBeth. After a divorce, he moved with his new wife, Penny, to Ireland to live at Moyne Park, Abbeyknockmoy, near Tuam in County Galway. A few months later, George MacBeth was diagnosed as suffering from motor neurone disease, of which he died in early 1992. In the last poetry he wrote, MacBeth provides an anatomy of a cruel disease and the destruction it caused two people deeply in love. Penny and George had two children, Diana ("Lally") Francesca Ronchetti MacBeth and George Edward Morton Mann MacBeth.

Poems from Oby (1982) was a Choice of the Poetry Book Society. He wrote the compilation while living at The Old Rectory, Oby; Oby is a Norfolk hamlet. He received a Geoffrey Faber Memorial Prize for his work.

MacBeth died in Tuam, County Galway, Ireland in 1992.

== Works ==
Poetry

- A Form of Words (1954)
- Lecture to the Trainees (1962)
- The Broken Places (1963)
- A Doomsday Book: Poems and Poem-games (1965)
- Missile Commander (1965)
- The Calf (1965)
- The Twelve Hotels (1965)
- The Colour of Blood (1967)
- The Screens (1967)
- A Death (1969)
- A War Quartet (1969)
- Night of Stones (1969)
- The Burning Cone (1970)
- Poems (1970)
- The Bamboo Nightingale (1970)
- The Hiroshima Dream (1970)
- The Snow Leopard (1970)
- Two Poems (1970)
- A Prayer Against Revenge (1971)
- The Orlando Poems (1971)
- Collected Poems 1958–1970 (1972)
- A Farewell (1972)
- A Litany (1972)
- Lusus: A Verse Lecture (1972)
- Shrapnel (1972)
- Prayers (1973)
- A Poet's Year (1973)
- The Vision (1973)
- Elegy for the Gas Dowsers (1974)
- In the Hours Waiting for Blood to Come (1975)
- The Journey to the Island (1975)
- Last Night (1976)
- Buying a Heart (1978)
- The Saddled Man (1978)
- Poem for Breathing (1979)
- Poems of Love and Death (1980)
- Typing a Novel About the War (1980)
- Poems from Oby (1982)
- The Long Darkness (1983)
- The Cleaver Garden (1986)
- Anatomy of Divorce (1988)
- Collected Poems, 1958–1982 (1989)
- Trespassing: Poems from Ireland (1991)
- The Patient (1992)
- Selected Poems (2002), edited by Anthony Thwaite

Novels

- The Transformation (1975)
- The Samurai (1976), also published as Cadbury and the Samurai
- The Survivor (1977)
- The Seven Witches (1978), also published as Cadbury and the Seven Witches
- The Born Losers (1982), also published as Cadbury and the Born Losers
- The Katana: A Novel Based on the War Diaries of John Beeby (1982), also published as A Kind of Treason
- Anna's Book (1983)
- The Lion of Pescara (1984)
- Another Love Story (1991)
- The Testament of Spencer (1992)

As Editor

- Penguin Book of Sick Verse (1963)
- Penguin Modern Poets 6 (1964) with Jack Clemo and Edward Lucie-Smith
- Penguin Book of Animal Verse (1965)
- Poetry 1900 to 1965 (1967)
- The Penguin Book of Victorian Verse (1969)
- The Falling Splendour, Poems of Alfred Lord Tennyson (1970)
- Free Form Poetry Two (1971), with Bob Cobbing
- The Book of Cats (1976), editor with Martin Booth
- Poetry 1900–75 (1980), anthology, editor
- Facts and Feelings in the Classroom (1983), editor with Martin Booth

Books for Children

- Noah's Journey (1966)
- Jonah and the Lord (1970)
- Noah and the Lord (1970)
- The Rectory Mice (1982)
- The Story of Daniel (1986)

Non-Fiction

- My Scotland: Fragments of a State of Mind (1973)
- Dizzy's Woman (1986)
- A Child of the War (1987)

Short Fiction

- Crab Apple Crisis (New Worlds, October 1966)

Drama

- The Humming Birds: A Monodrama (1968)
