= Patrick Süskind =

German writer and screenwriter (born 1949)

- Born: 26 March 1949 (age 77); Ambach, Bavaria, American occupation zone in Germany
- Occupations: Writer, screenwriter
- Partner: Tanja Graf
- Children: 1
- Writing career
- Period: 1980–present
- Notable works: Der Kontrabaß; Perfume: The Story of a Murderer; The Pigeon; The Story of Mr Sommer
- Movement: Magic realism

Patrick Süskind (German: [ˈpatʁɪk ˈzyːskɪnt]; born 26 March 1949) is a German writer and screenwriter, known best for his novel Perfume: The Story of a Murderer, first published in 1985.

== Early life ==
Süskind was born in Ambach, Bavaria. His father was writer and journalist, Wilhelm Emanuel Süskind, who worked for the newspaper Süddeutsche Zeitung and was a co-author of the well-known book Aus dem Wörterbuch des Unmenschen (From the Dictionary of an Inhuman), a critical collection of essays concerning the language of the Nazi era. His mother, Annemarie Süskind, née Schmitt, was a sports teacher; his older brother Martin Erhard Süskind (1944–2009) was a journalist and speechwriter.

After his qualification testing for university and his mandatory community service, Süskind studied medieval and modern history at LMU Munich and two semesters in Aix-en-Provence from 1968 to 1974, but never graduated. Funded by his parents, he relocated to Paris, where he wrote "mainly short, unpublished fiction and longer screenplays which were not made into films".

== Career ==
In 1981, he had his first major success with the play Der Kontrabaß (The Double Bass), which was conceived originally as a radio play. During the theatrical season of 1984–85, the play was performed more than 500 times. The only role is that of a tragi-comical orchestra musician. During the 1980s, working with the director Helmut Dietl, Süskind was also successful as a screenwriter for the television productions Monaco Franze (1983) and Kir Royal (1987), among others. In 1996 he won the Screenplay Prize of the German Department for Culture for his screenplay of Rossini, directed by Dietl. He rejected other awards, such as the FAZ-Literaturpreis, the Toucan Prize, and the Gutenberg Prize.

His best-known work is the novel Perfume: The Story of a Murderer (1985). Perfume was on the bestselling list of the German weekly news magazine Der Spiegel for nine years, has been translated into 49 languages and as of 2019 has worldwide sales of more than 20 million copies. In the early 2000s, it was included in the BBC's poll-generated list of the 100 best-loved novels. Also, it was adapted into a 2006 film directed by Tom Tykwer. Süskind has also published a novella, The Pigeon (1988), The Story of Mr Sommer (1991, illustrated by French cartoonist Sempé), Three Stories and a Reflection (1996), and an essay, On Love and Death (2006).

== Personal life ==
Süskind lives a reclusive, private lifestyle and divides his time between Munich and France. He rarely grants interviews and few photographs of him have been published.

His spouse is German publisher Tanja Graf [de], with whom he has a son.

== Selected works ==
- Der Kontrabaß (The Double Bass) (play, 1981)
- Das Parfum (Perfume: The Story of a Murderer) (novel, 1985)
- Die Taube (The Pigeon) (novella, 1988)
- Die Geschichte von Herrn Sommer (The Story of Mr Sommer) (novella, 1991)
- Drei Geschichten und eine Betrachtung (Three Stories and a Reflection) (stories, 1996) [Contents: Depth Wish, A Battle, Maître Mussard's Bequest, Amnesia in Litteris.]
- Über Liebe und Tod (On Love and Death) (essay, 2006)
