= Dolf Sternberger =

German philosopher and political scientist

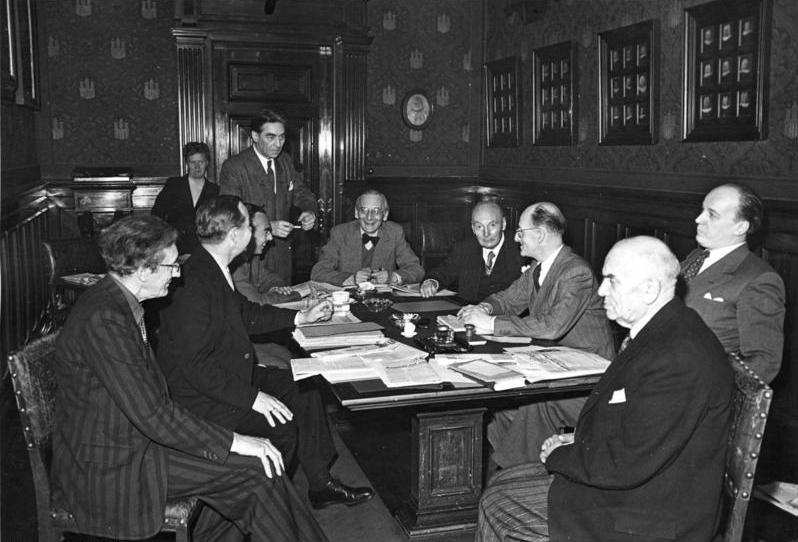
Dolf Sternberger (far right)

Dolf Sternberger (originally Adolf Sternberger; 28 July 1907 – 27 July 1989) was a German philosopher and political scientist at the University of Heidelberg.

== Biography ==
Dolf Sternberger was born in Wiesbaden in 1907.

He is known for his concept of citizenship in contemporary German political thought, and for coining the term "constitutional patriotism" (Verfassungspatriotismus) in 1979, on the occasion of the 30th anniversary of the Federal Republic of Germany. He died in Frankfurt/Main in 1989.

== See also ==
- Aus dem Wörterbuch des Unmenschen
