= Perfume (novel) =

1985 novel by Patrick Süskind

Perfume: The Story of a Murderer
- First edition (German)
- Author: Patrick Süskind
- Cover artist: Antoine Watteau, detail from Jupiter and Antiope, 1715–16
- Language: German
- Genre: Horror fiction, mystery, magic realism, absurdism
- Set in: Paris, Montpellier, Grasse and Plomb du Cantal; 1738–1767
- Publisher: Diogenes Verlag (Germany); Alfred A. Knopf (US); Hamish Hamilton (UK)
- Publication date: 1985
- Publication place: Germany
- Media type: Print (Hardback & paperback)
- Pages: 263 (UK hardback edition)
- ISBN: 0-241-11919-7 (UK hardback edition)
- OCLC: 14130766
- Dewey Decimal: 833.914
- LC Class: PT2681 .U74

Perfume: The Story of a Murderer (German: Das Parfum: Die Geschichte eines Mörders [das paʁˈfœ̃ː diː ɡəˈʃɪçtə ˈʔaɪnəs ˈmœʁdɐs]) is a 1985 literary historical fantasy novel by German writer Patrick Süskind. The novel explores the sense of smell and its relationship with the emotional meanings that scents may have.

The story follows Jean-Baptiste Grenouille, an unloved orphan in 18th-century France who is born with an exceptional sense of smell, capable of distinguishing a vast range of scents in the world around him. Grenouille becomes a perfumer but later becomes involved in murder when he encounters a young girl with an unsurpassed wondrous scent.

With translations into 49 languages and more than 20 million copies sold worldwide to date, Perfume is one of the best-selling German novels of the 20th century. The title remained in bestseller lists for about nine years and received almost unanimously positive national and international critical acclaim. It was translated into English by John E. Woods and won both the World Fantasy Award and the PEN Translation Prize in 1987. Some editions of the novel, including the first, have as their cover image Antoine Watteau's painting, Jupiter and Antiope, which depicts a sleeping woman.

== Plot ==
=== Part One ===
A boy is born in Paris, France in the year 1738, and subsequently abandoned. His mother is tried almost immediately for previous infanticide and subsequently executed, leaving him an orphan. He is named "Jean-Baptiste Grenouille" (grenouille being French for 'frog') and is fostered but is a difficult, solitary child and is eventually apprenticed to a local tanner. Unknown to other people, Grenouille has a remarkable sense of smell, giving him an extraordinary ability to discern the subtlest odors from complex mixtures of scents, and across great distances.

One day, long after having memorized nearly all the smells of the city, Grenouille is surprised by a unique smell. He finds the source of the scent: a young virgin girl. Entranced by her scent and believing that he alone must possess it, he strangles her and stays with her body until the scent has left it. In his quest to learn more about the art of perfume-making, he becomes apprenticed to one of the city's finest perfumers, Giuseppe Baldini, an aging, unskilled perfumer who has managed a successful business from two perfumes: one given to him by a relative and one that he bought from a traveling agent. Baldini eventually finds himself increasingly outperformed by rival perfumers and considers moving back to Italy with his wife.

However, Grenouille proves himself a prodigy by copying and improving a rival's perfume in Baldini's laboratory, after which Baldini offers him an apprenticeship. Baldini teaches Grenouille the basic techniques of perfumery while selling Grenouille's masterful new formulas as his own, restoring his flagging reputation. Baldini eventually reveals to Grenouille that there are techniques other than distillation that can be used to preserve a wider range of odours, which can only be learned in the heartland of the perfumer's craft, in the region of Grasse in the French Riviera. Shortly after, Grenouille elects to leave Paris, and Baldini dies when his shop collapses into the river Seine.

=== Part Two ===
On his way to Grasse, Grenouille travels the countryside and is increasingly disgusted by the scent of humanity. Avoiding civilization, he comes instead to live in a cave inside the Plomb du Cantal, surviving off the mountain's sparse vegetation and wildlife. However, his peace is ended when he realizes after seven years that he himself does not possess any scent: he cannot smell himself and neither, he finally understands, can other people. Traveling to Montpellier with a fabricated story about being kidnapped and kept in a cave for seven years to account for his haggard appearance, he creates a body odour for himself from everyday materials and finds that his new "disguise" tricks people into thinking that it is the scent of a human; he is now accepted by society instead of shunned. In Montpellier, he gains the patronage of the Marquis de La Taillade-Espinasse, who uses Grenouille to publicize his pseudoscientific theory about the influence of "fluidal" energies on human vitality. Grenouille manufactures perfumes which successfully distort the public perception of him from a wretched "caveman" into a clean and cultivated patrician, helping to win enormous popularity for the Marquis' theory. Seeing how easily humanity can be fooled by a simple scent, Grenouille's hatred becomes contempt. He realizes that it is within his ability to develop scents described as "superhuman" and "angelic" that will affect in unprecedented ways how other people perceive him.

=== Part Three ===
In Grasse, Grenouille discovers a young woman named Laure whose scent has the same captivating quality of the girl he killed before. Determined to preserve it, Grenouille starts working as an apprentice at a workshop and starts learning how to preserve scents by enfleurage, determined to kill Laure and extract her scent in two years’ time. Meanwhile, he kills 24 other young women, to practice how to preserve human scents and to use them as a base for the perfume that he will make with Laure's scent. Laure's father deduces that Laure will eventually be killed and tries to flee to save his daughter, but Grenouille tracks them and kills Laure as well. Despite his careful attention to detail, the police trace Laure's murder to him, and the hair and clothing of his previous victims are all discovered at his cabin near Grasse. He is caught soon afterwards and sentenced to death. However, on the way to his execution in the town square, Grenouille wears the new perfume he has created from his victims, and the scent immediately causes the crowd of spectators to fawn in awe and adoration of him, and although the evidence of his guilt is absolute, the townspeople become so fond of him, so convinced of the innocence he now exudes, that the magistrate reverses the court's verdict and he is freed; even Laure's father is enthralled by the new scent and asks if he would consider being adopted as his son. Soon the crowd is so overcome with lust and emotion that the entire town participates in a mass orgy of which no one speaks afterwards and which few can clearly remember. The magistrate reopens the investigation into the murders and they are eventually attributed to Grenouille's employer Dominique Druot, who is tortured into making a false confession and later hanged without ceremony. Afterwards, life returns to normal in Grasse.

=== Part Four ===
The effect his scent has had now confirmed to Grenouille how much he hates people, especially as he realizes that they worship him now and that even this degree of control does not give him satisfaction. He decides to return to Paris, intending to die there, and after a long journey ends up at the fish market where he was born. He pours the bottle of perfume he created on himself, and the people are so drawn to him that they are compelled to obtain parts of his body, eventually tearing him to pieces and eating him. The story ends with the crowd, now embarrassed by their actions, agreeing that they did it out of "love".

== Characters ==
In order of appearance:

- Grenouille's mother – Jean-Baptiste Grenouille was her fifth baby. She had claimed her first four were stillbirths or "semi-stillbirths". In her mid-twenties, with most of her teeth left, "some hair on her head", and a touch of gout, syphilis, and consumption, she was still quite pretty.
- Jean-Baptiste Grenouille – The novel's protagonist, born 17 July 1738 with an innate prodigious sense of smell (and also for unexplained reasons no personal scent of his own). His awareness of scent eventually causes him to conceive of capturing human scents, specifically those able to inspire love, which he lacks in his life. When he does succeed in this goal, he discovers it gives him no pleasure, and causes him only to despise others for being so easily fooled. Unable to find happiness, he is killed by a crowd after he pours his final perfume over himself. Grenouille's motivation for killing is described in the novel as purely the result of his desire to possess those rare scents capable of inspiring love towards their possessor:

"Grenouille let it go at that. He refrained from overpowering some whole, live person ... that sort of thing would have ... resulted in no new knowledge. He knew he was master of the techniques needed to rob a human of his or her scent, and knew it was unnecessary to prove this fact anew. Indeed, human odour was of no importance to him whatsoever. He could imitate human odour quite well enough with surrogates. What he coveted was the odour of certain human beings: that is, those rare humans who inspire love. Those were his victims."

- Jeanne Bussie – One of Grenouille's many wet-nurses. She is the first person to realise he does not have a scent and claims he is sucking all the life out of her.
- Father Terrier – A clergyman in charge of the church's charities and the distribution of its money to the poor and needy. He first thinks Grenouille is a cute baby, but once Grenouille begins to sniff Terrier, the priest becomes worried and sends the baby to a boarding house.
- Madame Gaillard – She does not have a sense of smell, due to being hit across the face with a poker during her younger years, so she does not know that Grenouille is scentless. In charge of a boarding house, her goal in life is to save enough money to have a proper death and funeral. Madame's poor sense of smell and ignorance about Grenouille's gifts, coupled with his assistance in finding her hidden money through his olfactory ability, cause Madame to believe he is psychic. Believing that psychic people bring bad luck and death, Madame sells Grenouille to the tanner Grimal. She loses all her money in old age, dies a miserable death in the Hôtel Dieu, and is not even buried individually after her death, but rather thrown into a mass grave.
- Children at the Boarding House – They are repulsed by Grenouille and even try, in vain, to suffocate him with rags and blankets while Grenouille is asleep.
- Grimal – A tanner who lives near the river in the rue de la Mortellerie. Grenouille works for him from age eight into his early youth until Baldini pays for him to be released. Grimal wastes this immense new income on an alcoholic binge; his drunkenness causes him to fall into a river and drown.
- The Plum Girl – Her natural scent is that of sea breeze, water lilies, and apricot blossoms; it is a rich, perfectly balanced, and magical scent. She has red hair and wears a gray, sleeveless dress. She is halving plums when Grenouille kills her as his first victim. Unable to retain her scent, her death motivates his quest to learn how human scent may be preserved.
- Giuseppe Baldini – An old traditional perfumer who sees his once-great reputation now fading away. He yearns for the old days when tastes in perfume did not change so quickly, and is angry at what he feels are upstarts in the now fast-moving perfume trade. He knows secretly that he never had a particular gift for creating and analyzing new scents; rather he had obtained the recipes which made his reputation from other sources. Lacking natural talent, he merely knows the art and business of perfumery and maintains a strict mystique to conceal the truth. His shop, located in the middle of the bridge Pont-au-Change, is filled with a mixture of scents so intoxicating that it scares away most potential customers. Baldini reluctantly permits Grenouille to demonstrate the copying of a competitor's perfume and is about to send Grenouille away when he realizes the copy is a faithful one; Grenouille then creates on the spot an exceptionally improved version of the original. Recognizing Grenouille's genius, Baldini buys him from Grimal as his apprentice and starts to rebuild his declining business. He becomes rich and famous once again from the new perfumes that Grenouille creates for him, though does not credit Grenouille for his contributions. He eventually gives Grenouille his journeyman papers. The very same night that Grenouille leaves Paris, Baldini's house and shop plunge into the river Seine when the bridge collapses, and the recipes for hundreds of Grenouille's perfumes are lost.
- Chénier – Baldini's assistant and apprentice for more than 30 years. He is somewhat younger than Baldini. He knows Baldini is talentless, but still boasts Baldini's skills in the hope that one day he will inherit Baldini's perfume shop.
- Pélissier – Baldini's chief rival, considered the most innovative perfumer in Paris despite not having any formal training. He is only mentioned and never appears in the novel.
- Marquis de La Taillade-Espinasse – Liege lord of the town of Pierrefort and a member of parliament. He is an amateur scientist who develops indulgent and ridiculous theses (his "fluidal theory"), which he attempts to demonstrate on Grenouille — also feeding him, providing him with new clothes, and giving him the opportunity to create a perfume. The Marquis dies soon after Grenouille's "disappearance", while pursuing his fluidal theory by attempting to live alone on the Pic du Canigou, a secluded mountain.
- Madame Arnulfi – A lively, black-haired woman of about thirty years of age. She has been widowed for almost a year. She owns the perfume business of her dead husband and has a journeyman named Druot, who is also her paramour. She hires Grenouille as her second journeyman.
- Dominique Druot – Madame Arnulfi's journeyman and paramour. He is the size of a Hun and is of average intelligence. Grenouille works for him as second journeyman. Druot is later hanged for Grenouille's crimes.
- Antoine Richis – Second consul and the richest man in Grasse, and Laure's father.
- Laure Richis – A beautiful red-headed girl, daughter of Antoine Richis, and the second girl whose scent is perceived as demanding capture by Grenouille. She is the inspiration for his lengthy killing spree as well as his final victim.

== Possible inspiration ==
The real-life story of Spanish serial killer Manuel Blanco Romasanta (1809–1863), also known as the "Tallow-Man", who killed several women and children, sold their clothes, and extracted their body-fat to make soap, resembles Grenouille's methods in some ways.

The name of Jean-Baptiste Grenouille might be inspired by the French perfumer Paul Grenouille, who changed his name into Grenoville when he opened his luxury perfume house in 1879.

== Style ==
The style of the novel can be characterized by the way it blends fantasy and fiction with factual information. That combination creates two distinguishable narrative lines - the fantastic one, which is conveyed in Grenouille's supernatural sense of smell, his odorlessness, and fairy-tale tones in the story, as well as the realistic one, composed of the socio-historical circumstances of the plot and naturalistic descriptions of the environment, the perfume production and murders. The novel’s realism is also visible in thorough descriptions of historical perfumery practices. According to Rindisbacher, the work "gathered together and phrased in popular terms the state of the art of olfactory and perfumistic knowledge and spun it into the realm of fantasy and imagination".

The diction of the novel evokes vivid sensory images. It links typically visual cognitive activities with the sense of smell, which is represented by the way Grenouille perceives the world. He understands more through olfaction, rather than vision, and that is reflected in the language of the novel, as the verbs in the literature normally associated with visual perception relate, in Grenouille’s case, to the process of smelling.

Another conspicuous stylistic feature of the work is an extensive use of intertextuality, which has been met with both positive and negative critical response. Literary allusions identified by the critics include references to works by Flaubert, Balzac, Baudelaire, E.T.A. Hoffmann, Thomas Mann, and Goethe. In the literature, for instance, there were observed some resemblances to the story of Faust. While Perfume received much praise for being original and imaginative, its citational structure has been either received enthusiastically for speaking to the literary acumen of the reader, or recognized as problematic, due to the overload of constant allusion and pastiche, or being considered a "parody" of other works.

== Adaptations ==
=== Film ===
- Perfume: The Story of a Murderer, co-written and directed by Tom Tykwer (who also composed the score), premiered in Germany on 14 September 2006.
- The Perfumier, was released for streaming on Netflix on 21 September 2022.

=== Television ===
- The episode "Sense Memory" (2011) of the American television show Criminal Minds bears many similarities to the novel.
- A six-part 2018 German television series, Perfume (Parfum), inspired by the novel and the film but set in the present day, stars Friederike Becht, Juergen Maurer, Wotan Wilke Möhring, and Christian Friedel.
- The episodes "The Gang Goes to Ireland and The Gang's Still in Ireland" (2021) of the American satire television show "It's Always Sunny in Philadelphia" allude to the novel as Dennis searches for an authentic redhaired woman to smell her hair, as they give off a 'pleasant odor' he is then frustrated when the woman whose hair he smells has no distinctive scent and insists she is a liar, this is then once more referenced in the following episode, explained by him experiencing psychosis brought on by a fever.

=== Music ===
- A Russian musical adaptation of the novel, Perfumer, premiered on 5 December 2010 in Moscow. Composer and singer Igor Demarin received Süskind's approval after communicating with a representative of Süskind for two years.
- The song "Scentless Apprentice" by the American grunge band Nirvana, from their 1993 album In Utero, was inspired by the novel Perfume. In an interview, lead singer and guitarist Kurt Cobain described the novel as one of his favourite books, which he re-read ten times and kept near him.
- The song "Herr Spiegelmann" from the Portuguese gothic-doom metal band Moonspell at Napalm records contains an excerpt from the book.
- The song "Red Head Girl" by French downtempo duo Air is inspired by Perfume.
- The song "Du riechst so gut" (German for "You smell so good") by Rammstein was inspired by the novel, which is one of lead singer Till Lindemann's favourite books.
- Marilyn Manson credits the novel as one of the inspirations behind the title of his second album, Smells Like Children.
- The song "Nearly Witches (Ever Since We Met)" by Panic! at the Disco is inspired by Perfume.
- The song "향 (Scentist)" by K-pop boy group VIXX and its music video are based on the novel.
- Perfume Genius' stage name was inspired by Tom Tykwer's film adaptation.

=== Sport ===
- Russian figure skater Anna Shcherbakova performed her 2019 season short program to excerpts from the film's score while portraying the 'leitmotiv' from the book: "defenselessness, the doom of beauty in the face of senseless cruelty". Her routine was staged by choreographer Daniil Gleikhengauz.
- Russian figure skater Petr Gumennik performed his 2025-2026 season short program to the film's score, portraying the story from the perspective of the murderer. He performed this program at the ISU Skate to Milano Qualifier in Beijing. He plans to use it in the 2026 Winter Olympics. His routine was staged by choreographer Daniil Gleichengauz.
